Millennials, also known as Generation Y or Gen Y, are the demographic cohort following Generation X and preceding Generation Z. Researchers and popular media use the early 1980s as starting birth years and the mid-1990s to early 2000s as ending birth years, with the generation typically being defined as people born from 1981 to 1996. Most millennials are the children of baby boomers and older Generation X; millennials are often the parents of Generation Alpha.

Across the globe, young people have postponed marriage. Millennials were born at a time of declining fertility rates around the world, and are having fewer children than their predecessors. Those in developing nations will continue to constitute the bulk of global population growth. In the developed world, young people of the 2010s were less inclined to have sexual intercourse compared to their predecessors when they were at the same age. In the West, they are less likely to be religious than their predecessors, but they may identify as spiritual.

Millennials have been described as the first global generation and the first generation that grew up in the Internet age. The generation is generally marked by elevated usage of and familiarity with the Internet, mobile devices, and social media, which is why they are sometimes termed digital natives. Between the 1990s and the 2010s, people from the developing world became increasingly well educated, a factor that boosted economic growth in these countries. Millennials across the world have suffered significant economic disruption since starting their working lives; many faced high levels of youth unemployment during their early years in the labour market in the wake of the Great Recession, and suffered another recession in 2020 due to the COVID-19 pandemic.

Terminology and etymology
Members of this demographic cohort are known as millennials because the oldest became adults around the turn of the millennium. Authors William Strauss and Neil Howe, known for creating the Strauss–Howe generational theory, are widely credited with naming the millennials. They coined the term in 1987, around the time children born in 1982 were entering kindergarten, and the media were first identifying their prospective link to the impending new millennium as the high school graduating class of 2000. They wrote about the cohort in their books Generations: The History of America's Future, 1584 to 2069 (1991) and Millennials Rising: The Next Great Generation (2000).

In August 1993, an Advertising Age editorial coined the phrase Generation Y to describe teenagers of the day, then aged 13–19 (born 1974–1980), who were at the time defined as different from Generation X. However, the 1974–1980 cohort was later re-identified by most media sources as the last wave of Generation X, and by 2003 Ad Age had moved their Generation Y starting year up to 1982. According to journalist Bruce Horovitz, in 2012, Ad Age "threw in the towel by conceding that millennials is a better name than Gen Y," and by 2014, a past director of data strategy at Ad Age said to NPR "the Generation Y label was a placeholder until we found out more about them."

Millennials are sometimes called echo boomers, due to them often being the offspring of the baby boomers, the significant increase in birth rates from the early 1980s to mid-1990s, and their generation's large size relative to that of boomers. In the United States, the echo boom's birth rates peaked in August 1990 and a twentieth-century trend toward smaller families in developed countries continued. Psychologist Jean Twenge described millennials as "Generation Me" in her 2006 book Generation Me: Why Today's Young Americans Are More Confident, Assertive, Entitled – and More Miserable Than Ever Before, while in 2013, Time magazine ran a cover story titled Millennials: The Me Me Me Generation. Alternative names for this group proposed include the Net Generation, Generation 9/11, Generation Next, and The Burnout Generation.

American sociologist Kathleen Shaputis labeled millennials as the Boomerang Generation or Peter Pan Generation because of the members' perceived tendency for delaying some rites of passage into adulthood for longer periods than most generations before them. These labels were also a reference to a trend toward members living with their parents for longer periods than previous generations. Kimberly Palmer regards the high cost of housing and higher education, and the relative affluence of older generations, as among the factors driving the trend. Questions regarding a clear definition of what it means to be an adult also impact a debate about delayed transitions into adulthood and the emergence of a new life stage, Emerging Adulthood. A 2012 study by professors at Brigham Young University found that college students were more likely to define "adult" based on certain personal abilities and characteristics rather than more traditional "rite of passage" events. Larry Nelson noted that "In prior generations, you get married and you start a career and you do that immediately. What young people today are seeing is that approach has led to divorces, to people unhappy with their careers ... The majority want to get married [...] they just want to do it right the first time, the same thing with their careers."

Date and age range definitions
Oxford Living Dictionaries describes a millennial as a person "born between the early 1980s and the late 1990s." Merriam-Webster Dictionary defines millennial as "a person born in the 1980s or 1990s."

Jonathan Rauch, senior fellow at the Brookings Institution, wrote for The Economist in 2018 that "generations are squishy concepts", but the 1981 to 1996 birth cohort is a "widely accepted" definition for millennials. Reuters also state that the "widely accepted definition" is 1981–1996. 

Likewise, the Pew Research Center defines millennials as the people born from 1981 to 1996, choosing these dates for "key political, economic and social factors", including the September 11 terrorist attacks, the 2003 invasion of Iraq, Great Recession, and Internet explosion. The United States Library of Congress explains that "defining generations is not an exact science", although cites Pew's 1981–1996 definition to define millennials. Various media outlets and statistical organizations have cited Pew's definition including Time magazine, BBC, The Washington Post, The New York Times, The Wall Street Journal, PBS, The Los Angeles Times, The Guardian, the United States Bureau of Labor Statistics, and Statistics Canada. The Brookings Institution defines the millennial generation as people born from 1981 to 1996, as does Gallup, Federal Reserve Board, American Psychological Association, CBS, and ABC Australia.

Australia's McCrindle Research uses 1980–1994 as Generation Y (millennial) birth years. The Australian Bureau of Statistics uses 1981-1995 to define Millennials in a 2021 Census report. Psychologist Jean Twenge defines millennials as those born 1980–1994. CNN reports that studies often use 1981–1996 to define millennials, but sometimes list 1980–2000. Although the United States Census Bureau have said that "there is no official start and end date for when millennials were born" and they do not officially define millennials, a U.S. Census publication in 2022 noted that Millennials are "colloquially defined as" the cohort born from 1981 to 1996, using this definition in a breakdown of Survey of Income and Program Participation (SIPP) data. In the UK, the Resolution Foundation uses 1981–2000. Sociologist Elwood Carlson, who calls the generation "New Boomers", identified the birth years of 1983–2001, based on the upswing in births after 1983 and finishing with the "political and social challenges" that occurred after the September 11 terrorist acts. Author Neil Howe, co-creator of the Strauss–Howe generational theory, defines millennials as being born from 1982 to 2004.

The cohorts born during the cusp years before and after millennials have been identified as "microgenerations" with characteristics of both generations. Names given to these cuspers include Xennials, Generation Catalano, the  Oregon Trail Generation; Zennials and Zillennials, respectively.

Psychology
Psychologist Jean Twenge, the author of the 2006 book Generation Me, considers millennials, along with younger members of Generation X, to be part of what she calls "Generation Me". Twenge attributes millennials with the traits of confidence and tolerance, but also describes a sense of entitlement and narcissism, based on NPI surveys showing increased narcissism among millennials compared to preceding generations when they were teens and in their twenties. Psychologist Jeffrey Arnett of Clark University, Worcester has criticized Twenge's research on narcissism among millennials, stating "I think she is vastly misinterpreting or over-interpreting the data, and I think it's destructive". He doubts that the Narcissistic Personality Inventory really measures narcissism at all. Arnett says that not only are millennials less narcissistic, they're "an exceptionally generous generation that holds great promise for improving the world". A study published in 2017 in the journal Psychological Science found a small decline in narcissism among young people since the 1990s.

Authors William Strauss and Neil Howe argue that each generation has common characteristics that give it a specific character with four basic generational archetypes, repeating in a cycle. According to their hypothesis, they predicted millennials would become more like the "civic-minded" G.I. Generation with a strong sense of community both local and global. Strauss and Howe ascribe seven basic traits to the millennial cohort: special, sheltered, confident, team-oriented, conventional, pressured, and achieving. However, Arthur E. Levine, author of When Hope and Fear Collide: A Portrait of Today's College Student, dismissed these generational images as "stereotypes". In addition, psychologist Jean Twenge says Strauss and Howe's assertions are overly deterministic, non-falsifiable, and unsupported by rigorous evidence.

Polling agency Ipsos-MORI warned that the word "millennials" is "misused to the point where it's often mistaken for just another meaningless buzzword" because "many of the claims made about millennial characteristics are simplified, misinterpreted or just plain wrong, which can mean real differences get lost" and that "[e]qually important are the similarities between other generations—the attitudes and behaviors that are staying the same are sometimes just as important and surprising."

Though it is often said that millennials ignore conventional advertising, they are in fact heavily influenced by it. They are particularly sensitive to appeals to transparency, to experiences rather than things, and flexibility.

A 2015 study by Microsoft found that 77% of respondents aged 18 to 24 said yes to the statement, "When nothing is occupying my attention, the first thing I do is reach for my phone," compared to just 10% for those aged 65 and over.

Cognitive abilities 
Intelligence researcher James R. Flynn discovered that back in the 1950s, the gap between the vocabulary levels of adults and children was much smaller than it is in the early twenty-first century. Between 1953 and 2006, adult gains on the vocabulary subtest of the Wechsler IQ test were 17.4 points whereas the corresponding gains for children were only 4. He asserted that some of the reasons for this are the surge in interest in higher education and cultural changes. The number of Americans pursuing tertiary qualifications and cognitively demanding jobs has risen significantly since the 1950s. This boosted the level of vocabulary among adults. Back in the 1950s, children generally imitated their parents and adopted their vocabulary. This was no longer the case in the 2000s, when teenagers often developed their own subculture and as such were less likely to use adult-level vocabulary on their essays.

In a 2009 report, Flynn analyzed the results of the Raven's Progressive Matrices test for British fourteen-year-olds from 1980 to 2008. He discovered that their average IQ had dropped by more than two points during that time period. Among those in the higher half of the intelligence distribution, the decline was even more significant, six points. This is a clear case of the reversal of the Flynn effect, the apparent rise in IQ scores observed during the twentieth century. Flynn suspected that this was due to changes in British youth culture. He further noted that in the past, IQ gains had been correlated with socioeconomic class, but this was no longer true.

Psychologists Jean Twenge, W. Keith Campbell, and Ryne A. Sherman analyzed vocabulary test scores on the U.S. General Social Survey and found that after correcting for education, the use of sophisticated vocabulary has declined between the mid-1970s and the mid-2010s across all levels of education, from below high school to graduate school. Those with at least a bachelor's degree saw the steepest decline. Hence, the gap between people who never received a high-school diploma and a university graduate has shrunk from an average of 3.4 correct answers in the mid- to late-1970s to 2.9 in the early- to mid-2010s. Higher education offers little to no benefits to verbal ability. Because those with only a moderate level of vocabulary were more likely to be admitted to university than in the past, the average for degree holders declined. There are various explanations for this. Accepting high levels of immigrants, many of whom not particularly proficient in the English language, could lower the national adult average. Young people nowadays are much less likely to read for pleasure, thus reducing their levels of vocabulary. On the other hand, while the College Board has reported that SAT verbal scores were on the decline, these scores are an imperfect measure of the vocabulary level of the nation as a whole because the test-taking demographic has changed and because more students take the SAT in the 2010s than in the 1970s, which means there are more with limited ability who took it. Population aging is unconvincing because the effect is too weak.

Cultural identity

In the United States

A 2007 report by the National Endowment of the Arts stated that as a group, American adults were reading for pleasure less often than before. In particular, Americans aged 15 to 24 spent an average of two hours watching television and only seven minutes on reading. In 2002, only 52% of Americans between the ages of 18 and 24 voluntarily read books, down from 59% in 1992. Reading comprehension skills of American adults of all levels of education deteriorated between the early 1990s and the early 2000s, especially among those with advanced degrees. According to employers, almost three quarters of university graduates were "deficient" in English writing skills. Meanwhile, the reading scores of American tenth-graders proved mediocre, in fifteenth place out of 31 industrialized nations, and the number of twelfth-graders who had never read for pleasure doubled to 19%.

Publishers and booksellers observed that the sales of adolescent and young-adult fiction remained strong. This could be because older adults were buying titles intended for younger people, which inflated the market, and because there were fewer readers buying more books.

By the late 2010s, viewership of late-night American television among adults aged 18 to 49, the most important demographic group for advertisers, has fallen substantially despite an abundance of materials. This is due in part to the availability and popularity of streaming services. However, when delayed viewing within three days is taken into account, the top shows all saw their viewership numbers boosted. This development undermines the current business model of the television entertainment industry. "If the sky isn't exactly falling on the broadcast TV advertising model, it certainly seems to be a lot closer to the ground than it once was," wrote reporter Anthony Crupi for Ad Age. Despite having the reputation for "killing" many things of value to the older generations, millennials and Generation Z are nostalgically preserving Polaroid cameras, vinyl records, needlepoint, and home gardening, to name just some. In fact, Millennials are a key cohort behind the vinyl revival. However, due to the COVID-19 pandemic in the early 2020s, certain items whose futures were in doubt due to a general lack of interest by millennials appear to be reviving with stronger sales than in previous years, such as canned food.

A 2019 poll by Ypulse found that among people aged 27 to 37, the musicians most representative of their generation were Taylor Swift, Beyoncé, the Backstreet Boys, Michael Jackson, Drake, and Eminem. (The last two were tied in fifth place.)

Since the 2000 U.S. Census, millennials have taken advantage of the possibility of selecting more than one racial group in abundance. In 2015, the Pew Research Center conducted research regarding generational identity that said a majority of millennials surveyed did not like the "millennial" label. It was discovered that millennials are less likely to strongly identify with the generational term when compared to Generation X or the baby boomers, with only 40% of those born between 1981 and 1997 identifying as millennials. Among older millennials, those born 1981–1988, Pew Research found that 43% personally identified as members of the older demographic cohort, Generation X, while only 35% identified as millennials. Among younger millennials (born 1989–1997), generational identity was not much stronger, with only 45% personally identifying as millennials. It was also found that millennials chose most often to define themselves with more negative terms such as self-absorbed, wasteful, or greedy.

Fred Bonner, a Samuel DeWitt Proctor Chair in Education at Rutgers University and author of Diverse Millennial Students in College: Implications for Faculty and Student Affairs, believes that much of the commentary on the Millennial Generation may be partially correct, but overly general and that many of the traits they describe apply primarily to "white, affluent teenagers who accomplish great things as they grow up in the suburbs, who confront anxiety when applying to super-selective colleges, and who multitask with ease as their helicopter parents hover reassuringly above them." During class discussions, Bonner listened to black and Hispanic students describe how some or all of the so-called core traits did not apply to them. They often said that the "special" trait, in particular, is unrecognizable. Other socioeconomic groups often do not display the same attributes commonly attributed to millennials. "It's not that many diverse parents don't want to treat their kids as special," he says, "but they often don't have the social and cultural capital, the time and resources, to do that."

The University of Michigan's "Monitoring the Future" study of high school seniors (conducted continually since 1975) and the American Freshman Survey, conducted by UCLA's Higher Education Research Institute of new college students since 1966, showed an increase in the proportion of students who consider wealth a very important attribute, from 45% for Baby Boomers (surveyed between 1967 and 1985) to 70% for Gen Xers, and 75% for millennials. The percentage who said it was important to keep abreast of political affairs fell, from 50% for Baby Boomers to 39% for Gen Xers, and 35% for millennials. The notion of "developing a meaningful philosophy of life" decreased the most across generations, from 73% for Boomers to 45% for millennials. The willingness to be involved in an environmental cleanup program dropped from 33% for Baby Boomers to 21% for millennials.

In general and in other countries

Political scientist Shirley Le Penne argues that for Millennials "pursuing a sense of belonging becomes a means of achieving a sense of being needed... Millennials experience belonging by seeking to impact the world." Educational psychologist Elza Venter believes Millennials are digital natives because they have grown up experiencing digital technology and have known it all their lives. Prensky coined the concept "digital natives" because the members of the generation are "native speakers of the digital language of computers, video games and the internet". This generation's older members use a combination of face-to-face communication and computer mediated communication, while its younger members use mainly electronic and digital technologies for interpersonal communication.

A 2013 survey of almost a thousand Britons aged 18 to 24 found that 62% had a favorable opinion of the British Broadcasting Corporation (BBC) and 70% felt proud of their national history. In 2017, research suggested nearly half of 18 to 34 year olds living in the UK had attended a live music event in the previous year.

Having faced the full brunt of the Great Recession, Millennials in Europe tended to be pessimistic about the future direction of their countries, though there were significant differences, the Pew Research Center found in 2014. Millennials from countries with relatively healthy economies such as Germany and the United Kingdom were generally happier than their counterparts from struggling economies, such as Spain, Italy, and Greece. On the other hand, the young were more likely than the old to feel optimistic.

Millennials came of age in a time where the entertainment industry began to be affected by the Internet. Using artificial intelligence, Joan Serrà and his team at the Spanish National Research Council studied the massive Million Song Dataset and found that between 1955 and 2010, popular music has gotten louder, while the chords, melodies, and types of sounds used have become increasingly homogenized. Indeed, producers seem to be engaging in a "Loudness war," with the intention of attracting more and more audience members. Serrà and his colleagues wrote, "...old tune with slightly simpler chord progressions, new instrument sonorities that were in agreement with current tendencies, and recorded with modern techniques that allowed for increased loudness levels could be easily perceived as novel, fashionable, and groundbreaking." While the music industry has long been accused of producing songs that are louder and blander, this is the first time the quality of songs is comprehensively studied and measured. Additional research showed that within the past few decades, popular music has gotten slower; that majorities of listeners young and old preferred older songs rather than keeping up with new ones; that the language of popular songs were becoming more negative psychologically; and that lyrics were becoming simpler and more repetitive, approaching one-word sheets, something measurable by observing how efficiently lossless compression algorithms (such as the LZ algorithm) handled them.

In modern society, there are inevitably people who refuse to conform to the dominant culture and seek to do the exact opposite; given enough time, the anti-conformists will become more homogeneous with respect to their own subculture, making their behavior the opposite to any claims of counterculture. This synchronization occurs even if more than two choices are available, such as multiple styles of beard rather than whether or not to have a beard. Mathematician Jonathan Touboul of Brandeis University who studies how information propagation through society affects human behavior calls this the hipster effect.

Once a highly successful genre on radio and then television, soap operas—characterized by melodramatic plots focused on interpersonal affairs and cheap production value—has been declining in viewership since the 1990s. Experts believe that this is due to their failure to attract younger demographics, the tendency of modern audiences have shorter attention spans, and the rise of reality television in the 1990s. Nevertheless, Internet streaming services do offer materials in the serial format, a legacy of soap operas. However, the availability of such on-demand platforms saw to it that soap operas would never again be the cultural phenomenon they were in the twentieth century, especially among the younger generations, not least because cliffhangers could no longer capture the imagination of the viewers the way they did in the past, when television shows were available as scheduled, not on demand.

Demographics

Asia

Chinese millennials are commonly called the post-80s and post-90s generations. At a 2015 conference in Shanghai organized by University of Southern California's US–China Institute, millennials in China were examined and contrasted with American millennials. Findings included millennials' marriage, childbearing, and child raising preferences, life and career ambitions, and attitudes towards volunteerism and activism. Due to the one-child policy introduced in the late 1970s, one-child households have become the norm in China, leading to rapid population aging, especially in the cities where the costs of living are much higher than in the countryside.

As a result of cultural ideals, government policy, and modern medicine, there has been severe gender imbalances in China and India. According to the United Nations, in 2018, there were 112 Chinese males aged 15 to 29 for every hundred females in that age group. That number in India was 111. China had a total of 34 million excess males and India 37 million, more than the entire population of Malaysia. Such a discrepancy fuels loneliness epidemics, human trafficking (from elsewhere in Asia, such as Cambodia and Vietnam), and prostitution, among other societal problems.

Singapore's birth rate has fallen below the replacement level of 2.1 since the 1980s before stabilizing by during the 2000s and 2010s. (It reached 1.14 in 2018, making it the lowest since 2010 and one of the lowest in the world.) Government incentives such as the baby bonus have proven insufficient to raise the birth rate. Singapore's experience mirrors those of Japan and South Korea.

Vietnam's median age in 2018 was 26 and rising. Between the 1970s and the late 2010s, life expectancy climbed from 60 to 76. It is now the second highest in Southeast Asia. Vietnam's fertility rate dropped from 5 in 1980 to 3.55 in 1990 and then to 1.95 in 2017. In that same year, 23% of the Vietnamese population was 15 years of age or younger, down from almost 40% in 1989. Other rapidly growing Southeast Asian countries, such as the Philippines, saw similar demographic trends.

Europe

From about 1750 to 1950, most of Western Europe transitioned from having both high birth and death rates to low birth and death rates. By the late 1960s and 1970s, the average woman had fewer than two children, and, although demographers at first expected a "correction", such a rebound came only for a few countries. Despite a bump in the total fertility rates (TFR) of some European countries in the very late twentieth century (the 1980s and 1990s), especially France and Scandinavia, it returned to replacement level only in Sweden (reaching a TFR of 2.14 in 1990, up from 1.68 in 1980), along with Ireland and Iceland; the bump in Sweden was largely due to improving economic output and the generous, far-reaching family benefits granted by the Nordic welfare system, while in France it was mostly driven by older women realizing their dreams of motherhood. For Sweden, the increase in the fertility rate came with a rise in the birth rate (going from 11.7 in 1980 to 14.5 in 1990), which slowed down and then stopped for a brief period to the aging of the Swedish population caused by the decline in birth rates in the late 1970s and early 1980s. To this day, France and Sweden still have higher fertility rates than most of Europe, and both almost reached replacement level in 2010 (2.03 and 1.98 respectively).

At first, falling fertility is due to urbanization and decreased infant mortality rates, which diminished the benefits and increased the costs of raising children. In other words, it became more economically sensible to invest more in fewer children, as economist Gary Becker argued. (This is the first demographic transition.) Falling fertility then came from attitudinal shifts. By the 1960s, people began moving from traditional and communal values towards more expressive and individualistic outlooks due to access to and aspiration of higher education, and to the spread of lifestyle values once practiced only by a tiny minority of cultural elites. (This is the second demographic transition.) Although the momentous cultural changes of the 1960s leveled off by the 1990s, the social and cultural environment of the very late twentieth-century was quite different from that of the 1950s. Such changes in values have had a major effect on fertility. Member states of the European Economic Community saw a steady increase in not just divorce and out-of-wedlock births between 1960 and 1985 but also falling fertility rates. In 1981, a survey of countries across the industrialized world found that while more than half of people aged 65 and over thought that women needed children to be fulfilled, only 35% of those between the ages of 15 to 24 (younger Baby Boomers and older Generation X) agreed. In the early 1980s, East Germany, West Germany, Denmark, and the Channel Islands had some of the world's lowest fertility rates.

At the start of the twenty-first century, Europe suffers from an aging population. This problem is especially acute in Eastern Europe, whereas in Western Europe, it is alleviated by international immigration. In addition, an increasing number of children born in Europe has been born to non-European parents. Because children of immigrants in Europe tend to be about as religious as they are, this could slow the decline of religion (or the growth of secularism) in the continent as the twenty-first century progresses. In the United Kingdom, the number of foreign-born residents stood at 6% of the population in 1991. Immigration subsequently surged and has not fallen since (as of 2018). Research by the demographers and political scientists Eric Kaufmann, Roger Eatwell, and Matthew Goodwin suggest that such a fast ethno-demographic change is one of the key reasons behind public backlash in the form of national populism across the rich liberal democracies, an example of which is the 2016 United Kingdom European Union membership referendum (Brexit).

Italy is a country where the problem of an aging population is especially acute. The fertility rate dropped from about four in the 1960s down to 1.2 in the 2010s. This is not because young Italians do not want to procreate. Quite the contrary, having many children is an Italian ideal. But its economy has been floundering since the Great Recession of 2007–08, with the youth unemployment rate at a staggering 35% in 2019. Many Italians have moved abroad—150,000 did in 2018—and many are young people pursuing educational and economic opportunities. With the plunge in the number of births each year, the Italian population is expected to decline in the next five years. Moreover, the Baby Boomers are retiring in large numbers, and their numbers eclipse those of the young people taking care of them. Only Japan has an age structure more tilted towards the elderly.

Greece also suffers from a serious demographic problem as many young people are leaving the country in search of better opportunities elsewhere in the wake of the Great Recession. This brain drain and a rapidly aging population could spell disaster for the country.

Overall, E.U. demographic data shows that the number of people aged 18 to 33 in 2014 was 24% of the population, with a high of 28% for Poland and a low of 19% for Italy.

As a result of the shocks due to the decline and dissolution of the Soviet Union, Russia's birth rates began falling in the late 1980s while death rates have risen, especially among men. In the early 2000s, Russia had not only a falling birth rate but also a declining population despite having an improving economy. Between 1992 and 2002, Russia's population dropped from 149 million to 144 million. According to the "medium case scenario" of the U.N.'s Population Division, Russia could lose another 20 million people by the 2020s.

Europe's demographic reality contributes to its economic troubles. Because the European baby boomers failed to replace themselves, by the 2020s and 2030s, dozens of European nations will find their situation even tougher than before.

Oceania

Australia's total fertility rate has fallen from above three in the post-war era, to about replacement level (2.1) in the 1970s to below that in the late 2010s. However, immigration has been offsetting the effects of a declining birthrate. In the 2010s, among the residents of Australia, 5% were born in the United Kingdom, 3% from China, 2% from India, and 1% from the Philippines. 84% of new arrivals in the fiscal year of 2016 were below 40 years of age, compared to 54% of those already in the country. Like other immigrant-friendly countries, such as Canada, the United Kingdom, and the United States, Australia's working-age population is expected to grow till about 2025. However, the ratio of people of working age to retirees (the dependency ratio) has gone from eight in the 1970s to about four in the 2010s. It could drop to two by the 2060s, depending in immigration levels. "The older the population is, the more people are on welfare benefits, we need more health care, and there's a smaller base to pay the taxes," Ian Harper of the Melbourne Business School told ABC News (Australia). While the government has scaled back plans to increase the retirement age, to cut pensions, and to raise taxes due to public opposition, demographic pressures continue to mount as the buffering effects of immigration are fading away.

North America

Historically, the early Anglo-Protestant settlers in the seventeenth century were the most successful group, culturally, economically, and politically, and they maintained their dominance till the early twentieth century. Commitment to the ideals of the Enlightenment meant that they sought to assimilate newcomers from outside of the British Isles, but few were interested in adopting a pan-European identity for the nation, much less turning it into a global melting pot. But in the early 1900s, liberal progressives and modernists began promoting more inclusive ideals for what the national identity of the United States should be. While the more traditionalist segments of society continued to maintain their Anglo-Protestant ethnocultural traditions, universalism and cosmopolitanism started gaining favor among the elites. These ideals became institutionalized after the Second World War, and ethnic minorities started moving towards institutional parity with the once dominant Anglo-Protestants. The Immigration and Nationality Act of 1965 (also known as the Hart-Cellar Act), passed at the urging of President Lyndon B. Johnson, abolished national quotas for immigrants and replaced it with a system that admits a fixed number of persons per year based in qualities such as skills and the need for refuge. Immigration subsequently surged from elsewhere in North America (especially Canada and Mexico), Asia, Central America, and the West Indies. By the mid-1980s, most immigrants originated from Asia and Latin America. Some were refugees from Vietnam, Cuba, Haiti, and other parts of the Americas while others came illegally by crossing the long and largely undefended U.S.-Mexican border. At the same time, the postwar baby boom and subsequently falling fertility rate seemed to jeopardize America's social security system as the Baby Boomers retire in the twenty-first century. Provisional data from the Center for Disease Control and Prevention reveal that U.S. fertility rates have fallen below the replacement level of 2.1 since 1971. (In 2017, it fell to 1.765.)

Millennial population size varies, depending on the definition used. Using its own definition, the Pew Research Center estimated that millennials comprised 27% of the U.S. population in 2014. In the same year, using dates ranging from 1982 to 2004, Neil Howe revised the number to over 95 million people in the U.S. In a 2012 Time magazine article, it was estimated that there were approximately 80 million U.S. millennials. The United States Census Bureau, using birth dates ranging from 1982 to 2000, stated the estimated number of U.S. millennials in 2015 was 83.1 million people.

In 2017, fewer than 56% millennial were non-Hispanic whites, compared with more than 84% of Americans in their 70s and 80s, 57% had never been married, and 67% lived in a metropolitan area. According to the Brookings Institution, millennials are the "demographic bridge between the largely white older generations (pre-millennials) and much more racially diverse younger generations (post-millennials)."

By analyzing data from the U.S. Census Bureau, the Pew Research Center estimated that millennials, whom they define as people born between 1981 and 1996, outnumbered baby boomers, born from 1946 to 1964, for the first time in 2019. That year, there were 72.1 million millennials compared to 71.6 million baby boomers, who had previously been the largest living adult generation in the country. Data from the National Center for Health Statistics shows that about 62 million millennials were born in the United States, compared to 55 million members of Generation X, 76 million baby boomers, and 47 million from the Silent Generation. Between 1981 and 1996, an average of 3.9 million millennial babies were born each year, compared to 3.4 million average Generation X births per year between 1965 and 1980. But millennials continue to grow in numbers as a result of immigration and naturalization. In fact, millennials form the largest group of immigrants to the United States in the 2010s. Pew projected that the millennial generation would reach around 74.9 million in 2033, after which mortality would outweigh immigration. Yet 2020 would be the first time millennials (who are between the ages of 24 and 39) find their share of the electorate shrink as the leading wave of Generation Z (aged 18 to 23) became eligible to vote. In other words, their electoral power peaked in 2016. In absolute terms, however, the number of foreign-born millennials continues to increase as they become naturalized citizens. In fact, 10% of American voters were born outside the country by the 2020 election, up from 6% in 2000. The fact that people from different racial or age groups vote differently means that this demographic change will influence the future of the American political landscape. While younger voters hold significantly different views from their elders, they are considerably less likely to vote. Non-whites tend to favor candidates from the Democratic Party while whites by and large prefer the Republican Party.

As of the mid-2010s, the United States is one of the few developed countries that does not have a top-heavy population pyramid. In fact, as of 2016, the median age of the U.S. population was younger than that of all other rich nations except Australia, New Zealand, Cyprus, Ireland, and Iceland, whose combined population is only a fraction of the United States. This is because American baby boomers had a higher fertility rate compared to their counterparts from much of the developed world. Canada, Germany, Italy, Japan, and South Korea are all aging rapidly by comparison because their millennials are smaller in number than their parents. This demographic reality puts the United States at an advantage compared to many other major economies as the millennials reach middle age: the nation will still have a significant number of consumers, investors, and taxpayers.

According to the Pew Research Center, "Among men, only 4% of millennials [ages 21 to 36 in 2017] are veterans, compared with 47%" of men in their 70s and 80s, "many of whom came of age during the Korean War and its aftermath." Some of these former military service members are combat veterans, having fought in Afghanistan and/or Iraq. As of 2016, millennials are the majority of the total veteran population. According to the Pentagon in 2016, 19% of Millennials are interested in serving in the military, and 15% have a parent with a history of military service.

Economic prospects and trends

According to the International Labour Organization (ILO), 200 million people were unemployed in 2015. Of these, 73.3 million (37%) were 15 and 24 years of age. Between 2009 and 2015, youth unemployment increased considerably in North Africa and the Middle East, and slightly in East Asia. During the same period, it fell noticeably in Europe (both within and without the E.U.), and the rest of the developed world, Sub-Saharan Africa, Southeast Asia, Central and South America, but remained steady in South Asia. The ILO estimated that some 475 million jobs will need to be created worldwide by the mid-2020s in order to appreciably reduce the number of unemployed youths.

In 2018, as the number of robots at work continued to increase, the global unemployment rate fell to 5%, the lowest in 38 years. Current trends suggest that developments in artificial intelligence and robotics will not result in mass unemployment but can actually create high-skilled jobs. However, in order to take advantage of this situation, one needs to hone skills that machines have not yet mastered, such as teamwork and effective communication.

By analyzing data from the United Nations and the Global Talent Competitive Index, KDM Engineering found that as of 2019, the top five countries for international high-skilled workers are Switzerland, Singapore, the United Kingdom, the United States, and Sweden. Factors taken into account included the ability to attract high-skilled foreign workers, business-friendliness, regulatory environment, the quality of education, and the standard of living. Switzerland is best at retaining talents due to its excellent quality of life. Singapore is home to a world-class environment for entrepreneurs. And the United States offers the most opportunity for growth due to the sheer size of its economy and the quality of higher education and training. As of 2019, these are also some of the world's most competitive economies, according to the World Economic Forum (WEF). In order to determine a country or territory's economic competitiveness, the WEF considers factors such as the trustworthiness of public institutions, the quality of infrastructure, macro-economic stability, the quality of healthcare, business dynamism, labor market efficiency, and innovation capacity.

During the first two decades of the twenty-first century, right before the COVID-19 pandemic, economic activities tended to concentrate in the large metropolitan areas, such as San Francisco, New York, London, Tokyo and Sydney. Productivity increased enormously as knowledge workers agglomerated. The COVID-19 pandemic led to an increase in remote work, more so in developed countries, aided by technology.

Using a variety of measures, economists have reached the conclusion that the rate of innovation and entrepreneurship has been declining across the Western world between the early 1990s and early 2010s, when it leveled off. In the case of the U.S., one of the most complex economies in existence, economist Nicholas Kozeniauskas explained that "the decline in entrepreneurship is concentrated among the smart" as the share of entrepreneurs with university degrees in that country more than halved between the mid-1980s and the mid-2010s. There are many possible reasons for this: population aging, market concentration, and zombie firms (those with low productivity but are kept alive by subsidies). While employment has become more stable and more suitable, modern economies are so complex they are essentially ossified, making them vulnerable to disruptions.

In Asia
Statistics from the International Monetary Fund (IMF) reveal that between 2014 and 2019, Japan's unemployment rate went from about 4% to 2.4% and China's from almost 4.5% to 3.8%. These are some of the lowest rates among the largest economies of the world. However, due to long-running sub-replacement fertility, Japan had just over two workers per retiree in the 2010s, compared to four in North America. As a result, the country faces economic stagnation and serious financial burden to support the elderly. China's economy was growing at a feverish pace between the late 1970s till the early 2010s, when demographic constraints made themselves felt. Key to China's "economic miracle" was its one-child policy, which curbed population growth and enabled the economy to industrialize rapidly. Yet the policy has also led to population aging. Political economist and demographer Nicholas Eberstadt argued that China's working population peaked in 2014. Even so, economist Brad Setser suggested that China can still increase its GDP per capita by raising the age of retirement and making it easier for people to migrate from rural to urban areas. But social scientist Wang Feng warned that as the population ages, social welfare spending as a share of GDP will also grow, intensifying sociopolitical problems. During the mid-2010s, China had five workers for every retiree. But if current trends continue, by the 2040s, that ratio will fall to just 1.6.

At the start of the twenty-first century, export-oriented South Korea and Taiwan were young and dynamic compared to Japan, but they, too, were aging quickly. Their millennial cohorts are too small compared to the baby boomers. The fact that large numbers of South Koreans and Taiwanese were entering retirement will restrict the ability of their countries to save and invest.

According to IMF, "Vietnam is at risk of growing old before it grows rich." The share of working-age Vietnamese peaked in 2011, when the country's annual GDP per capita at purchasing power parity was $5,024, compared to $32,585 for South Korea, $31,718 for Japan, and $9,526 for China. Many Vietnamese youths suffer from unstable job markets, low wages, and high costs of living in the cities. As a result, large numbers live with their parents till the age of 30. These are some of the reasons contributing to Vietnam's falling fertility rate and population aging.

In Europe

Economic prospects for some millennials have declined largely due to the Great Recession in the late 2000s. Several governments have instituted major youth employment schemes out of fear of social unrest due to the dramatically increased rates of youth unemployment. In Europe, youth unemployment levels were very high (56% in Spain, 44% in Italy, 35% in the Baltic states, 19% in Britain and more than 20% in many more countries). In 2009, leading commentators began to worry about the long-term social and economic effects of the unemployment.

A variety of names have emerged in various European countries hard hit following the financial crisis of 2007–2008 to designate young people with limited employment and career prospects. These groups can be considered to be more or less synonymous with millennials, or at least major sub-groups in those countries. The Generation of €700 is a term popularized by the Greek mass media and refers to educated Greek twixters of urban centers who generally fail to establish a career. In Greece, young adults are being "excluded from the labor market" and some "leave their country of origin to look for better options". They are being "marginalized and face uncertain working conditions" in jobs that are unrelated to their educational background, and receive the minimum allowable base salary of €700 per month. This generation evolved in circumstances leading to the Greek debt crisis and some participated in the 2010–2011 Greek protests. In Spain, they are referred to as the mileurista (for €1,000 per month), in France "The Precarious Generation," and as in Spain, Italy also has the "milleurista"; generation of €1,000 (per month).

Between 2009 and 2018, about half a million Greek youths left their country in search of opportunities elsewhere, and this phenomenon has exacerbated the nation's demographic problem. Such brain drains are rare among countries with good education systems. Greek millennials benefit from tuition-free universities but suffer from their government's mishandling of taxes and excessive borrowing. Greek youths typically look for a career in finance in the United Kingdom, medicine in Germany, engineering in the Middle East, and information technology in the United States. Many also seek advanced degrees abroad in order to ease the visa application process.

In 2016, research from the Resolution Foundation found millennials in the United Kingdom earned £8,000 less in their 20s than Generation X, describing millennials as "on course to become the first generation to earn less than the one before". According to a report from the same organization in 2017, the rate of home ownership of British baby boomers was 75% and "the real value of estates passing on death has more than doubled over the past 20 years." For this reason, the transfer of wealth between the baby boomers and their children, the millennials, will prove highly beneficial to the latter compared to previous cohorts, especially those who came from high-income families.

Statistics from the International Monetary Fund (IMF) reveal that between 2014 and 2019, unemployment rates fell in most of the world's major economies, many of which in Europe. Although the unemployment rates of France and Italy remained relatively high, they were markedly lower than previously. Meanwhile, the German unemployment rate dipped below even that of the United States, a level not seen since the German reunification almost three decades prior. Eurostat reported in 2019 that overall unemployment rate across the European Union dropped to its lowest level since January 2000, at 6% in August, meaning about 15.4 million people were out of a job. The Czech Republic (3%), Germany (3%) and Malta (3%) enjoyed the lowest levels of unemployment. Member states with the highest unemployment rates were Italy (10%), Spain (14%), and Greece (17%). Countries with higher unemployment rates compared to 2018 were Denmark (from 4.9% to 5%), Lithuania (6% to 7%), and Sweden (3% to 7%).

In November 2019, the European Commission expressed concern over the fact that some member states have "failed to put their finances in order". Belgium, France, and Spain had a debt-to-GDP ratio of almost 100% each while Italy's was 136%. Under E.U. rules, member nations must take steps to decrease public debt if it exceeds 60% of GDP. The Commission commended Greece for making progress in economic recovery.

According to the European Centre for the Development of Vocational Training (Cedefop), the European Union in the late 2010s suffers from shortages of science, technology, engineering, and mathematics (STEM) specialists (including information and communications technology (ICT) professionals), medical doctors, nurses, midwives and schoolteachers. However, the picture varies depending on the country. In Italy, environmentally friendly architecture is in high demand. Estonia and France are running short of legal professionals. Ireland, Luxembourg, Hungary, and the United Kingdom need more financial experts. All member states except Finland need more ICT specialists, and all but Belgium, Greece, Spain, Hungary, Latvia, Lithuania, Luxembourg, Portugal and the United Kingdom need more teachers. The supply of STEM graduates has been insufficient because the dropout rate is high and because of an ongoing brain drain from some countries. Some countries need more teachers because many are retiring and need to be replaced. At the same time, Europe's aging population necessitates the expansion of the healthcare sector. Disincentives for (potential) workers in jobs in high demand include low social prestige, low salaries, and stressful work environments. Indeed, many have left the public sector for industry while some STEM graduates have taken non-STEM jobs.

Spanish think-tank Fedea noted that there were way too few young Europeans enrolled in vocational programs that teach them skills favored by the job market. Many new entrants to the workforce lacked the necessary skills demanded by employers.

Even though pundits predicted that the uncertainty due to the 2016 Brexit Referendum would cause the British economy to falter or even fall into a recession, the unemployment rate has dipped below 4% while real wages have risen slightly in the late 2010s, two percent as of 2019. In particular, medical doctors and dentists saw their earnings bumped above the inflation rate in July 2019. Despite the fact that the government promised to an increase in public spending (£13 billion, or 0.6% of GDP) in September 2019, public deficit continues to decline, as it has since 2010. Nevertheless, uncertainty surrounding Britain's international trade policy suppressed the chances of an export boom despite the depreciation of the pound sterling. According to the Office for National Statistics, the median income of the United Kingdom in 2018 was £29,588.

Since joining the European Union during the 2007 enlargement of the European Union, Bulgaria has seen a significant portion of its population, many of whom young and educated, leave for better opportunities elsewhere, notably Germany. While the government has failed to keep reliable statistics, economists have estimated that at least 60,000 Bulgarians leave their homeland each year. 30,000 moved to Germany in 2017. As of 2019, an estimated 1.1 million Bulgarians lived abroad. Bulgaria had a population of about seven million in 2018, and this number is projected to continue to decline not just due to low birth rates but also to emigration.

Due to the strong correlation between economic growth and youth employment, recessions come with dire consequences for young people in the workforce. In the struggling Southern European economies, such as Greece and Spain, youth unemployment lingered on in the aftermath of the Great Recession, remaining stuck at around a third. With another recession induced by the COVID-19 global pandemic, it could rise to about half. Even the Czech Republic, which previously boasted the lowest youth unemployment rate in Europe, at about 5%, could see that number triple in 2020. Overall, European job markets are hostile towards new entrants, who, unlike their older counterparts, do not have permanent contracts and are often the first to be laid off during hard times.

In Canada
In Canada, the youth unemployment rate in July 2009 was 16%, the highest in 11 years. Between 2014 and 2019, Canada's overall unemployment rate fell from about 7% to below 6%. However, a 2018 survey by accounting and advisory firm BDO Canada found that 34% of millennials felt "overwhelmed" by their non-mortgage debt. For comparison, this number was 26% for Generation X and 13% for the Baby Boomers. Canada's average non-mortgage debt was CAN$20,000 in 2018. About one in five millennials were delaying having children because of financial worries. Many Canadian millennial couples are also struggling with their student loan debts.

Despite expensive housing costs, Canada's largest cities, Vancouver, Toronto, and Montreal, continue to attract millennials thanks to their economic opportunities and cultural amenities. Research by the Royal Bank of Canada (RBC) revealed that for every person in the 20-34 age group who leaves the nation's top cities, Toronto gains seven while Vancouver and Montreal gain up to a dozen each. In fact, there has been a surge in the millennial populations of Canada's top three cities between 2015 and 2018. However, millennials' rate of home ownership will likely drop as increasing numbers choose to rent instead. By 2019, however, Ottawa emerged as a magnet for millennials with its strong labor market and comparatively low cost of living, according to a study by Ryerson University. Many of the millennials relocating to the nation's capital were above the age of 25, meaning they were more likely to be job seekers and home buyers rather than students.

An average Canadian home was worth C$484,500 in 2018. Despite government legislation (mortgage stress test rules), such a price was quite high compared to some decades before. Adjusted for inflation, it was C$210,000 in 1976. Paul Kershaw of the University of British Columbia calculated that the average amount of extra money needed for a down payment in the late 2010s compared to one generation before was equivalent to eating 17 avocado toasts each day for ten years. Meanwhile, the option of renting in a large city is increasingly out of reach for many young Canadians. In 2019, the average rent in Canada cost C$1,040 a month, according to the Canada Mortgage and Housing Corporation (CMHC). But, as is always the case in real-estate, location matters. An average two-bedroom apartment cost C$1,748 per month in Vancouver and C$1,547 per month in Toronto, with vacancy rates at about 1.1% and 1.5%, respectively. Canada's national vacancy rate was 2.4% in 2018, the lowest since 2009. New supply—rental apartment complexes that are newly completed or under construction—has not been able to keep up with rising demand. Besides higher prices, higher interest rates and stricter mortgage rules have made home ownership more difficult. International migration contributes to rising demand for housing, especially rental apartments, according to the CMHC, as new arrivals tend to rent rather than purchase. Moreover, a slight decline in youth unemployment in 2018 also drove up demand. While the Canadian housing market is growing, this growth is detrimental to the financial well-being of young Canadians.

In 2019, Canada's net public debt was C$768 billion. Meanwhile, U.S. public debt amounted to US$22 trillion. The Canadian federal government's official figure for the debt-to-GDP ratio was 31%. However, this figure left out debts from lower levels of government. Once these were taken into account, the figure jumped to 88%, according to the International Monetary Fund. For comparison, that number was 238% for Japan, 107% for the United States, and 99% for France. Canada's public debt per person was over CAN$18,000. For Americans, it was US$69,000. Since the Great Recession, Canadian households have accumulated significantly more debt. According to Statistics Canada, the national debt-to-disposable income ratio was 175% in 2019. It was 105% in the U.S. Meanwhile, the national median mortgage debt rose from C$95,400 in 1999 to C$190,000 in 2016 (in 2016 dollars). Numbers are much higher in the Greater Toronto Area, Vancouver, and Victoria, B.C.

A 2018 survey by Abacus Data of 4,000 Canadian millennials found that 80% identified as members of the middle class, 55% had pharmaceutical insurance, 53% dental insurance, 36% a Registered Retirement Savings Plan (RRSP), and 29% an employer-sponsored pension plan. A number of millennials have opted to save their money and retire early while traveling rather than settling in an expensive North American city. According to them, such a lifestyle costs less than living in a large city.

Between the late-2000s and mid-2010s, Canada's tourism deficit—the difference in the amount Canadian travelers spent inside versus outside the nation—grew considerably, exceeding CAN$10 billion in 2008. According to Destination Canada, a Crown agency responsible for promoting tourism in Canada, younger Canadians were eight times more likely to travel outside Canada than inside the nation. This is due to a number of factors. The cost of transportation within Canada was often higher than that of traveling to other countries. For example, flight tickets to Europe were often cheaper than to Toronto or Montreal. Many Canadian millennials view foreign destinations as exotic and more desirable than in Canada. Social media influenced this tendency, as posts showcasing non-Canadian sites were better received than those about Canadian destinations.

In the United States

Employment and finances

Quantitative historian Peter Turchin observed that demand for labor in the United States had been stagnant since 2000 and would likely continue to 2020 as the nation approached the trough of the Kondratiev wave. (See graphic.) Moreover, the share of people in their 20s continued to grow till the end of the 2010s according projections by the U.S. Census Bureau, meaning the youth bulge would likely not fade away before the 2020s. As such the gap between the supply and demand in the labor market would likely not fall before then, and falling or stagnant wages generate sociopolitical stress. For example, between the mid-1970s and 2011, the number of law-school graduates tripled, from around 400,000 to 1.2 million while the population grew by only 45%. During the 2010s, U.S. law schools produced 25,000 surplus graduates each year, and many of them were in debt. The number of people with a Master's of Business Administration (MBA) degree grew even faster. Having more highly educated people than the market can absorb—elite overproduction—can destabilize society.

The youth unemployment rate in the U.S. reached a record 19% in July 2010 since the statistic started being gathered in 1948. Underemployment is also a major factor. In the U.S. the economic difficulties have led to dramatic increases in youth poverty, unemployment, and the numbers of young people living with their parents. In April 2012, it was reported that half of all new college graduates in the US were still either unemployed or underemployed.

In fact, millennials have benefited the least from the economic recovery following the Great Recession, as average incomes for this generation have fallen at twice the general adult population's total drop and are likely to be on a path toward lower incomes for at least another decade. According to a Bloomberg L.P., "Three and a half years after the worst recession since the Great Depression, the earnings and employment gap between those in the under-35 population and their parents and grandparents threatens to unravel the American dream of each generation doing better than the last. The nation's younger workers have benefited least from an economic recovery that has been the most uneven in recent history." Despite higher college attendance rates than Generation X, many were stuck in low-paid jobs, with the percentage of degree-educated young adults working in low-wage industries rising from 23% to 33% between 2000 and 2014. Not only did they receive lower wages, they also had to work longer hours for fewer benefits. By the mid-2010s, it had already become clear that the U.S. economy was evolving into a highly dynamic and increasingly service-oriented system, with careers getting replaced by short-term full-time jobs, full-time jobs by part-time positions, and part-time positions by income-generating hobbies. In one important way the economic prospects of millennials are similar to those of their parents the baby boomers: their huge number means that the competition for jobs was always going to be intense.

A 2013 joint study by sociologists at the University of Virginia and Harvard University found that the decline and disappearance of stable full-time jobs with health insurance and pensions for people who lack a college degree has had profound effects on working-class Americans, who now are less likely to marry and have children within marriage than those with college degrees. Data from a 2014 study of U.S. millennials revealed over 56% of this cohort considers themselves as part of the working class, with only approximately 35% considering themselves as part of the middle class; this class identity is the lowest polling of any generation. A 2020 paper by economists William G. Gale, Hilary Gelfond, Jason J. Fichtner, and Benjamin H. Harris examines the wealth accumulated by different demographic cohorts using data from the Survey of Consumer Finances. They find that while the Great Recession has diminished the wealth of all age groups in the short run, a longitudinal analysis reveals that older generations have been able to acquire more wealth whereas millennials have gotten poorer overall. In particular, the wealth of millennials in 2016 was less than that of older generations when they were their age in 1989 and 2007. Millennials enjoy a number of important advantages compared to their elders, such as higher levels of education, and longer working lives, but they suffer some disadvantages including limited prospects of economic growth, leading to delayed home ownership and marriage.

Millennials are the most highly educated and culturally diverse group of all generations, and have been regarded as hard to please when it comes to employers. To address these new challenges, many large firms are currently studying the social and behavioral patterns of millennials and are trying to devise programs that decrease intergenerational estrangement, and increase relationships of reciprocal understanding between older employees and millennials. The UK's Institute of Leadership & Management researched the gap in understanding between millennial recruits and their managers in collaboration with Ashridge Business School. The findings included high expectations for advancement, salary and for a coaching relationship with their manager, and suggested that organizations will need to adapt to accommodate and make the best use of millennials. In an example of a company trying to do just this, Goldman Sachs conducted training programs that used actors to portray millennials who assertively sought more feedback, responsibility, and involvement in decision making. After the performance, employees discussed and debated the generational differences which they saw played out. In 2014, millennials were entering an increasingly multi-generational workplace. Even though research has shown that millennials are joining the workforce during a tough economic time, they still have remained optimistic, as shown when about nine out of ten millennials surveyed by the Pew Research Center said that they currently have enough money or that they will eventually reach their long-term financial goals.

According to a 2019 TD Ameritrade survey of 1,015 U.S. adults aged 23 and older with at least US$10,000 in investable assets, two thirds of people aged 23 to 38 (millennials) felt they were not saving enough for retirement, and the top reason why was expensive housing (37%). This was especially true for millennials with families. 21% said student debt prevented them from saving for the future. For comparison, this number was 12% for Generation X and 5% for the Baby Boomers. While millennials are well known for taking out large amounts of student loans, these are actually not their main source of non-mortgage personal debt, but rather credit card debt. According to a 2019 Harris poll, the average non-mortgage personal debt of millennials was US$27,900, with credit card debt representing the top source at 25%. For comparison, mortgages were the top source of debt for the Baby Boomers and Generation X (28% and 30%, respectively) and student loans for Generation Z (20%).

According to the U.S. Department of Labor, the unemployment rate in September 2019 was 3.5%, a number not seen since December 1969. For comparison, unemployment attained a maximum of 10% after the Great Recession in October 2009. At the same time, labor participation remained steady and most job growth tended to be full-time positions. Economists generally consider a population with an unemployment rate lower than 4% to be fully employed. In fact, even people with disabilities or prison records are getting hired. Between June 2018 and June 2019, the U.S. economy added a minimum of 56,000 jobs (February 2019) and a maximum of 312,000 jobs (January 2019). The average monthly job gain between the same period was about 213,600. Tony Bedikian, managing director and head of global markets at Citizens Bank, said this is the longest period of economic expansion on record. At the same time, wages continue to grow, especially for low-income earners. On average, they grew by 2.7% in 2016 and 3.3% in 2018. However, the Pew Research Center found that the average wage in the U.S. in 2018 remained more or less the same as it was in 1978, when the seasons and inflation are taken into consideration. Real wages grew only for the top 90th percentile of earners and to a lesser extent the 75th percentile (in 2018 dollars). Nevertheless, these developments ease fears of an upcoming recession. Moreover, economists believe that job growth could slow to an average of just 100,000 per month and still be sufficient to keep up with population growth and keep economic recovery going. As long as firms keep hiring and wages keep growing, consumer spending should prevent another recession. Millennials are expected to make up approximately half of the U.S. workforce by 2020.

As they saw their economic prospects improved in the aftermath of the Great Recession, the COVID-19 global pandemic hit, forcing lock-down measures that resulted in an enormous number of people losing their jobs. For millennials, this is the second major economic downturn in their adult lives so far. However, by early 2022, as the pandemic waned, workers aged 25 to 64 were returning to the work force at a steady pace. According to the Economist, if the trend continued, then their work-force participation would return to the pre-pandemic level of 83% by the end of 2022. Even so, the U.S. economy would continue to face labor shortages, which puts workers at an advantage while contributing to inflation.

Human capital is the engine of economic growth. With this in mind, urban researcher Richard Florida and his collaborators analyzed data from the U.S. Census from between 2012 and 2017 and found that the ten cities with the largest shares of adults with a bachelor's degree or higher are Seattle (63%), San Francisco, the District of Columbia, Raleigh, Austin, Minneapolis, Portland, Denver, Atlanta, and Boston (48%). More specifically, the ten cities with the largest shares of people with graduate degrees are the District of Columbia (33%), Seattle, San Francisco, Boston, Atlanta, Minneapolis, Portland, Denver, Austin, and San Diego (19%). These are the leading information technology hubs of the United States. Cities with the lowest shares of college graduates tend to be from the Rust Belt, such as Detroit, Memphis, and Milwaukee, and the Sun Belt, such as Las Vegas, Fresno, and El Paso. Meanwhile, the ten cities with the fastest growth in the shares of college-educated adults are Miami (46%), Austin, Fort Worth, Las Vegas, Denver, Charlotte, Boston, Mesa, Nashville, and Seattle (25%). More specifically, those with the fastest growing shares of adults with graduate degrees are Miami (47%), Austin, Raleigh, Charlotte, San Jose, Omaha, Seattle, Fresno, Indianapolis, and Sacramento (32%).

Florida and his team also found, using U.S. Census data between 2005 and 2017, an increase in employment across the board for members of the "creative class"—people in education, healthcare, law, the arts, technology, science, and business, not all of whom have a university degree—in virtually all U.S. metropolitan areas with a population of a million or more. Indeed, the total number of the creative class grew from 44 million in 2005 to over 56 million in 2017. Florida suggested that this could be a "tipping point" in which talents head to places with a high quality of life yet lower costs of living than well-established creative centers, such as New York City and Los Angeles, what he called the "superstar cities".

According to the Department of Education, people with technical or vocational training are slightly more likely to be employed than those with a bachelor's degree and significantly more likely to be employed in their fields of specialty. The United States currently suffers from a shortage of skilled tradespeople. As of 2019, the most recent data from the U.S. government reveals that there are over half a million vacant manufacturing jobs in the country, a record high, thanks to an increasing number of Baby Boomers entering retirement. But in order to attract new workers to overcome this "Silver Tsunami," manufacturers need to debunk a number of misconceptions about their industries. For example, the American public tends to underestimate the salaries of manufacturing workers. Nevertheless, the number of people doubting the viability of American manufacturing has declined to 54% in 2019 from 70% in 2018, the L2L Manufacturing Index measured. After the Great Recession, the number of U.S. manufacturing jobs reached a minimum of 11.5 million in February 2010. It rose to 12.8 million in September 2019. It was 14 million in March 2007. As of 2019, manufacturing industries made up 12% of the U.S. economy, which is increasingly reliant on service industries, as is the case for other advanced economies around the world. Nevertheless, twenty-first-century manufacturing is increasingly sophisticated, using advanced robotics, 3D printing, cloud computing, among other modern technologies, and technologically savvy employees are precisely what employers need. Four-year university degrees are unnecessary; technical or vocational training, or perhaps apprenticeships would do.

According to the Bureau of Labor Statistics, the occupations with the highest median annual pay in the United States in 2018 included medical doctors (especially psychiatrists, anesthesiologists, obstetricians and gynecologists, surgeons, and orthodontists), chief executives, dentists, information system managers, chief architects and engineers, pilots and flight engineers, petroleum engineers, and marketing managers. Their median annual pay ranged from about US$134,000 (marketing managers) to over US$208,000 (aforementioned medical specialties). Meanwhile, the occupations with the fastest projected growth rate between 2018 and 2028 are solar cell and wind turbine technicians, healthcare and medical aides, cyber security experts, statisticians, speech–language pathologists, genetic counselors, mathematicians, operations research analysts, software engineers, forest fire inspectors and prevention specialists, post-secondary health instructors, and phlebotomists. Their projected growth rates are between 23% (medical assistants) and 63% (solar cell installers); their annual median pays range between roughly US$24,000 (personal care aides) to over US$108,000 (physician assistants). Occupations with the highest projected numbers of jobs added between 2018 and 2028 are healthcare and personal aides, nurses, restaurant workers (including cooks and waiters), software developers, janitors and cleaners, medical assistants, construction workers, freight laborers, marketing researchers and analysts, management analysts, landscapers and groundskeepers, financial managers, tractor and truck drivers, and medical secretaries. The total numbers of jobs added ranges from 881,000 (personal care aides) to 96,400 (medical secretaries). Annual median pays range from over US$24,000 (fast-food workers) to about US$128,000 (financial managers).

Despite economic recovery and despite being more likely to have a bachelor's degree or higher, millennials are at a financial disadvantage compared to the Baby Boomers and Generation X because of the Great Recession and expensive higher education. Income has become less predictable due to the rise of short-term and freelance positions. According to a 2019 report from the non-partisan non-profit think tank New America, a household headed by a person under 35 in 2016 had an average net worth of almost US$11,000, compared to US$20,000 in 1995. According to the St. Louis Federal Reserve, an average millennial (20 to 35 in 2016) owned US$162,000 of assets, compared to US$198,000 for Generation X at the same age (20 to 35 in 2001). Risk management specialist and business economist Olivia S. Mitchell of the University of Pennsylvania calculated that in order to retire at 50% of their last salary before retirement, millennials will have to save 40% of their incomes for 30 years. She told CNBC, "Benefits from Social Security are 76% higher if you claim at age 70 versus 62, which can substitute for a lot of extra savings." Maintaining a healthy lifestyle—avoiding smoking, over-drinking, and sleep deprivation—should prove beneficial.

Housing

Despite the availability of affordable housing, and broadband Internet, the possibility of telecommuting, the reality of high student loan debts and the stereotype of living in their parents' basement, millennials were steadily leaving rural counties for urban areas for lifestyle and economic reasons in the early 2010s. At that time, millennials were responsible for the so-called "back-to-the-city" trend. Between 2000 and 2010, the number of Americans living in urban areas grew from 79% to 81% while that in rural areas dropped from 21% to 19%. At the same time, many new cities were born, especially in the Midwest, and others, such as Charlotte, North Carolina, and Austin, Texas, were growing enormously. According to demographer William Frey of the Brookings Institution, the population of young adults (18–34 years of age) in U.S. urban cores increased 5% between 2010 and 2015, the bulk of which can be attributed to ethnic-minority millennials. In fact, this demographic trend was making American cities and their established suburbs more ethnically diverse. On the other hand, white millennials were the majority in emerging suburbs and exurbs. Mini-apartments, initially found mainly in Manhattan, became more and more common in other major urban areas as a strategy for dealing with high population density and high demand for housing, especially among people living alone. The size of a typical mini-apartment is 300 square feet (28 square meters), or roughly the size of a standard garage and one eighth the size of an average single-family home in the U.S. as of 2013. Many young city residents were willing to give up space in exchange for living in a location they liked. Such apartments are also common in Tokyo and some European capitals. Data from the Census Bureau reveals that in 2018, 34% of American adults below the age of 35 owned a home, compared to the national average of almost 64%.

Yet by the late 2010s, things changed. Like older generations, millennials reevaluate their life choices as they age. Millennials no longer felt attracted by cosmopolitan metropolitan areas the way they once did. A 2018 Gallup poll found that despite living in a highly urbanized country, most Americans would rather live in rural counties than the cities. While rural America lacked the occupational diversity offered by urban America, multiple rural counties can still match one major city in terms of economic opportunities. In addition, rural towns suffered from shortages of certain kinds of professionals, such as medical doctors, and young people moving in, or back, could make a difference for both themselves and their communities. The slower pace of life and lower costs of living were both important.

By analyzing U.S. Census data, demographer William H. Frey at the Brookings Institution found that, following the Great Recession, American suburbs grew faster than dense urban cores. For example, for every one person who moved to New York City, five moved out to one of its suburbs. Data released by the U.S. Census Bureau in 2017 revealed that Americans aged 25–29 were 25% more likely to move from a city to a suburb than the other way around; for older millennials, that number was 50%. Economic recovery and easily obtained mortgages help explain this phenomenon. Millennial homeowners are more likely to be in the suburbs than the cities. This trend will likely continue as more and more millennials purchase a home. 2019 was the fourth year in a row where the number of millennials living in the major American cities declined measurably. Exurbs are increasingly popular among millennials, too. According to Karen Harris, managing director at Bain Macro Trends, at the current rate of growth, exurbs will have more people than cities for the first time in 2025. In 2018, 80,000 millennials left the nation's largest cities. Among the Baby Boomers who have retired, a significant portion opts to live in the suburbs, where the Millennials are also moving to in large numbers as they have children of their own. These confluent trends increase the level of economic activities in the American suburbs.

While 14% of the U.S. population relocate at least once each year, Americans in their 20s and 30s are more likely to move than retirees, according to Frey. People leaving the big cities generally look for places with low cost of living, including housing costs, warmer climates, lower taxes, better economic opportunities, and better school districts for their children. Economics of space is also important, now that it has become much easier to transmit information and that e-commerce and delivery services have contracted perceived distances. Places in the South and Southwestern United States are especially popular. In some communities, millennials and their children are moving in so quickly that schools and roads are becoming overcrowded. This rising demand pushes prices upwards, making affordable housing options less plentiful. Historically, between the 1950s and 1980s, Americans left the cities for the suburbs because of crime. Suburban growth slowed because of the Great Recession but picked up pace afterwards. According to the Brookings Institution, overall, American cities with the largest net losses in their millennial populations were New York City, Los Angeles, and Chicago, while those with the top net gains were Houston, Denver, and Dallas. According to Census data, Los Angeles County in particular lost 98,608 people in 2018, the single biggest loss in the nation. Moving trucks (U-Haul) are in extremely high demand in the area.

High taxes and high cost of living are also reasons why people are leaving entire states behind. As is the case with cities, young people are the most likely to relocate. For example, a 2019 poll by Edelman Intelligence of 1,900 residents of California found that 63% of millennials said they were thinking about leaving the Golden State and 55% said they wanted to do so within five years. 60% of millennials said the reason why they wanted to move as the cost and availability of housing. In 2018, the median home price in California was US$547,400, about twice the national median. California also has the highest marginal income tax rate of all U.S. states, 12%, plus a subcharge of 1% for those earning a million dollars a year or more. Popular destinations include Oregon, Nevada, Arizona, and Texas, according to California's Legislative Analyst's Office. By analyzing data provided by the Internal Revenue Service (IRS), finance company SmartAsset found that for wealthy millennials, defined as those no older than 35 years of age earning at least US$100,000 per annum, the top states of departure were New York, Illinois, Virginia, Massachusetts, and Pennsylvania, while the top states of destination were California, Washington State, Texas, Colorado, and Florida. SmartAsset also found that the cities with the largest percentages of millennial homeowners in 2018 were Anchorage, AK; Gilbert and Peoria, AZ; Palmdale, Moreno Valley, Hayward, and Garden Grove, CA; Cape Floral, FL; Sioux Falls, SD; and Midland, TX. Among these cities, millennial home-owning rates were between 57% (Gilbert, AZ) and 34% (Hayward, CA). The median price of a home purchased by millennials in 2019 was $256,500, compared to $160,600 for Generation Z. Broadly speaking, the two demographic cohorts are migrating in opposite directions, with the millennials moving North and Generation Z going South.

Average home sizes was declining between the early- and late-2010s. Nevertheless, entry-level homes, which almost ceased to exist due to the housing bubble, started to return in numbers as builders respond to rising demand from millennials. In order to cut construction costs, builders offer few to no options for floor plans. Previously, the Great Recession forced millennials delay home ownership. But by the late 2010s, older millennials had accumulated sufficient savings and were ready to buy a home, get married, and have children. Prices have risen in the late 2010s due to high demand, but this could attract more companies to enter the business of building affordable homes.

As a consequence of the COVID-19 pandemic in the United States, interest in suburban properties skyrocketed, with millennials being the largest block of buyers. In May 2020, when the real-estate market was recovering, searches for suburban properties rose 13%, or twice the rate for urban areas. This trend was observed in more than 50 of the largest 100 American metropolitan areas. In New York City, for example, demand for apartment units in Manhattan nosedived at an annualized rate of 80% in May. As more and more people reconsider whether they would like to live in a densely populated urban environment with high-rise apartments, cultural amenities, and shared spaces rather than a suburban single-family home with their own backyard, the homebuilding industry was seeing better recovery than expected. As millennials and senior citizens increasingly demand affordable housing outside the major cities, to prevent another housing bubble, banks and regulators have restricted lending to filter out speculators and those with bad credit.

By the time they neared midlife in the early 2020s, the bulk of older American millennials had entered the housing market. Polling commissioned by CNBC suggested that by February 2021 59% of those born from 1981 to 1988 owned their own home. Most of this group had owned a home for more than five years whilst the vast majority had used a mortgage to help fund their purchase. However, the research also indicated that 28% of individuals in this age range were renting whilst 12% still lived with their parents or other family. Members of this cohort were less likely to be homeowners than their elders had at the same age. Individuals with tertiary education were substantially more likely to own a home than those without it. Those of black and Hispanic ethnicity were slightly less likely to be homeowners than their white counterparts. The most common reason responders gave for not having bought a home was lack of sufficient savings.

Education

Global trends 
From the late 1990s to the late 2010s, education transformed the economic realities of countries worldwide. As the people from developing nations became better educated, they close the gap between them and the developed world. Hence Westerners lost their relative advantage in education, as the world saw more people with high-school diplomas than ever before; the number of people with bachelor's and advanced degrees grew significantly as well. Westerners who only passed secondary school had their income cut in real terms during that same period while those with university degrees had incomes that barely increased on average. In addition, the fact that many jobs can be done remotely thanks to modern technology further eroded the relative advantage of education in the West, resulting in a backlash against immigration and globalization.

As more and more women became educated in the developing world, more leave the rural areas for the cities, enter the work force and compete with men, sparking resentment among men in those countries.

For information on public support for higher education (for domestic students) in the OECD in 2011, see chart below.

In Europe
In Sweden, universities are tuition-free, as is the case in Norway, Denmark, Iceland, and Finland. However, Swedish students typically graduate very indebted due to the high cost of living in their country, especially in the large cities such as Stockholm. The ratio of debt to expected income after graduation for Swedes was about 80% in 2013. In the U.S., despite incessant talk of student debt reaching epic proportions, that number stood at 60%. Moreover, about seven out of eight Swedes graduate with debt, compared to one half in the U.S. In the 2008–09 academic year, virtually all Swedish students take advantage of state-sponsored financial aid packages from a govern agency known as the Centrala Studiestödsnämnden (CSN), which include low-interest loans with long repayment schedules (25 years or until the student turns 60). In Sweden, student aid is based on their own earnings whereas in some other countries, such as Germany or the United States, such aid is premised on parental income as parents are expected to help foot the bill for their children's education. In the 2008–09 academic year, Australia, Austria, Japan, the Netherlands, and New Zealand saw an increase in both the average tuition fees of their public universities for full-time domestic students and the percentage of students taking advantage of state-sponsored student aid compared to 1995. In the United States, there was an increase in the former but not the latter.

In 2005, judges in Karlsruhe, Germany, struck down a ban on university fees as unconstitutional on the grounds that it violated the constitutional right of German states to regulate their own higher education systems. This ban was introduced in order to ensure equality of access to higher education regardless of socioeconomic class. Bavarian Science Minister Thomas Goppel told the Associated Press, "Fees will help to preserve the quality of universities." Supporters of fees argued that they would help ease the financial burden on universities and would incentivize students to study more efficiently, despite not covering the full cost of higher education, an average of €8,500 as of 2005. Opponents believed fees would make it more difficult for people to study and graduate on time. Germany also suffered from a brain drain, as many bright researchers moved abroad while relatively few international students were interested in coming to Germany. This has led to the decline of German research institutions.

In the 1990s, due to a combination of financial hardship and the fact that universities elsewhere charged tuition, British universities pressed the government to allow them to take in fees. A nominal tuition fee of £1,000 was introduced in autumn 1998. Because not all parents would be able to pay all the fees in one go, monthly payment options, loans, and grants were made available. Some were concerned that making people pay for higher education may deter applicants. This turned out not to be the case. The number of applications fell by only 3% in 1998, and mainly due to mature students rather than 18-year-olds.

In 2012, £9,000 worth of student fees were introduced. Despite this, the number of people interested in pursuing higher education grew at a faster rate than the UK population. In 2017, almost half of young people in England had received higher education by the age of 30. Prime Minister Tony Blair introduced the goal of having half of young Britons having a university degree in 1999, though the 2010 deadline was missed. What the Prime Minister did not realize, however, is that an oversupply of young people with high levels of education historically precipitated periods of political instability and unrest in various societies, from early modern Western Europe and late Tokugawa Japan to the Soviet Union, modern Iran, and the United States. In any case, demand for higher education in the United Kingdom has remained strong throughout the early 21st century, driven by the need for high-skilled workers from both the public and private sectors. There has been, however, a widening gender gap. As of 2017, women were more likely to attend or to have attended university than men, by 55% against 43%, a difference of 12 percentage points.

In Oceania and North America 
In Australia, university tuition fees were introduced in 1989. Regardless, the number of applicants has risen considerably. By the 1990s, students and their families were expected to pay 37% of the cost, up from a quarter in the late 1980s. The most expensive subjects were law, medicine, and dentistry, followed by the natural sciences, and then by the arts and social studies. Under the new funding scheme, the Government of Australia also capped the number of people eligible for higher education, enabling schools to recruits more well-financed (though not necessarily bright) students.

According to the Pew Research Center, 53% of American millennials attended or were enrolled in university in 2002. For comparison, the number of young people attending university was 44% in 1986. By the 2020s, 39% of millennials had at least a bachelor's degree, more than the Baby Boomers at 25%, the Economist reports. Historically, university students were more likely to be male than female. The difference was especially great during the second half of the twentieth century, when enrollment rose dramatically compared to the 1940s. This trend continues into the twenty-first century. But things started to change by the turn of the new millennium. By the late 2010s, the situation has reversed. Women are now more likely to enroll in university than men. In 2018, upwards of one third of each sex is a university student.

In the United States today, high school students are generally encouraged to attend college or university after graduation while the options of technical school and vocational training are often neglected. Historically, high schools separated students on career tracks, with programs aimed at students bound for higher education and those bound for the workforce. Students with learning disabilities or behavioral issues were often directed towards vocational or technical schools. All this changed in the late 1980s and early 1990s thanks to a major effort in the large cities to provide more abstract academic education to everybody. The mission of high schools became preparing students for college, referred to as "high school to Harvard." However, this program faltered in the 2010s, as institutions of higher education came under heightened skepticism due to high costs and disappointing results. People became increasingly concerned about debts and deficits. No longer were promises of educating "citizens of the world" or estimates of economic impact coming from abstruse calculations sufficient. Colleges and universities found it necessary to prove their worth by clarifying how much money from which industry and company funded research, and how much it would cost to attend.

Because jobs (that suited what one studied) were so difficult to find in the few years following the Great Recession, the value of getting a liberal arts degree and studying the humanities at an American university came into question, their ability to develop a well-rounded and broad-minded individual notwithstanding. As of 2019, the total college debt has exceeded US$1.5 trillion, and two out of three college graduates are saddled with debt. The average borrower owes US$37,000, up US$10,000 from ten years before. A 2019 survey by TD Ameritrade found that over 18% of millennials (and 30% of Generation Z) said they have considered taking a gap year between high school and college.

In 2019, the Federal Reserve Bank of St. Louis published research (using data from the 2016 Survey of Consumer Finances) demonstrating that after controlling for race and age cohort families with heads of household with post-secondary education who were born before 1980 there have been wealth and income premiums, while for families with heads of household with post-secondary education but born after 1980 the wealth premium has weakened to point of statistical insignificance (in part because of the rising cost of college) and the income premium while remaining positive has declined to historic lows (with more pronounced downward trajectories with heads of household with postgraduate degrees). Quantitative historian Peter Turchin noted that the United States was overproducing university graduates—he termed this elite overproduction—in the 2000s and predicted, using historical trends, that this would be one of the causes of political instability in the 2020s, alongside income inequality, stagnating or declining real wages, growing public debt. According to Turchin, intensifying competition among graduates, whose numbers were larger than what the economy could absorb, leads to political polarization, social fragmentation, and even violence as many become disgruntled with their dim prospects despite having attained a high level of education. He warned that the turbulent 1960s and 1970s could return, as having a massive young population with university degrees was one of the key reasons for the instability of the past.

According to the American Academy of Arts and Sciences, students were turning away from liberal arts programs. Between 2012 and 2015, the number of graduates in the humanities dropped from 234,737 to 212,512. Consequently, many schools have relinquished these subjects, dismissed faculty members, or closed completely. Data from the National Center for Education Statistics revealed that between 2008 and 2017, the number of people majoring in English plummeted by just over a quarter. At the same time, those in philosophy and religion fell 22% and those who studied foreign languages dropped 16%. Meanwhile, the number of university students majoring in homeland security, science, technology, engineering, and mathematics (STEM), and healthcare skyrocketed. (See figure below.)

According to the U.S. Department of Education, people with technical or vocational trainings are slightly more likely to be employed than those with a bachelor's degree and significantly more likely to be employed in their fields of specialty. The United States currently suffers from a shortage of skilled tradespeople.

Despite the fact that educators and political leaders, such as President Barack Obama, have been trying to years to improve the quality of STEM education in the United States, and that various polls have demonstrated that more students are interested in these subjects, graduating with a STEM degree is a different kettle of fish altogether. According to The Atlantic, 48% of students majoring in STEM dropped out of their programs between 2003 and 2009. Data collected by the University of California, Los Angeles, (UCLA) in 2011 showed that although these students typically came in with excellent high school GPAs and SAT scores, among science and engineering students, including pre-medical students, 60% changed their majors or failed to graduate, twice the attrition rate of all other majors combined. Despite their initial interest in secondary school, many university students find themselves overwhelmed by the reality of a rigorous STEM education. Some are mathematically unskilled, while others are simply lazy. The National Science Board raised the alarm all the way back in the mid-1980s that students often forget why they wanted to be scientists and engineers in the first place. Many bright students had an easy time in high school and failed to develop good study habits. In contrast, Chinese, Indian, and Singaporean students are exposed to mathematics and science at a high level from a young age. Moreover, according education experts, many mathematics schoolteachers were not as well-versed in their subjects as they should be, and might well be uncomfortable with mathematics. Given two students who are equally prepared, the one who goes to a more prestigious university is less likely to graduate with a STEM degree than the one who attends a less difficult school. Competition can defeat even the top students. Meanwhile, grade inflation is a real phenomenon in the humanities, giving students an attractive alternative if their STEM ambitions prove too difficult to achieve. Whereas STEM classes build on top of each other—one has to master the subject matter before moving to the next course—and have black and white answers, this is not the case in the humanities, where things are a lot less clear-cut.

In 2015, educational psychologist Jonathan Wai analyzed average test scores from the Army General Classification Test in 1946 (10,000 students), the Selective Service College Qualification Test in 1952 (38,420), Project Talent in the early 1970s (400,000), the Graduate Record Examination between 2002 and 2005 (over 1.2 million), and the SAT Math and Verbal in 2014 (1.6 million). Wai identified one consistent pattern: those with the highest test scores tended to pick the physical sciences and engineering as their majors while those with the lowest were more likely to choose education. (See figure below.)
During the 2010s, the mental health of American graduate students in general was in a state of crisis.

Historical knowledge
A February 2018 survey of 1,350 individuals found that 66% of the American millennials (and 41% of all U.S. adults) surveyed did not know what Auschwitz was, while 41% incorrectly claimed that 2 million Jews or fewer were killed during the Holocaust, and 22% said that they had never heard of the Holocaust. Over 95% of American millennials were unaware that a portion of the Holocaust occurred in the Baltic states, which lost over 90% of their pre-war Jewish population, and 49% were not able to name a single Nazi concentration camp or ghetto in German-occupied Europe. However, at least 93% surveyed believed that teaching about the Holocaust in school is important and 96% believed the Holocaust happened.

The YouGov survey found that 42% of American millennials have never heard of Mao Zedong, who ruled China from 1949 to 1976 and was responsible for the deaths of 20–45 million people; another 40% are unfamiliar with Che Guevara.

Health and welfare

Health problems
According to a 2018 report from Cancer Research UK, millennials in the United Kingdom are on track to have the highest rates of overweight and obesity, with current data trends indicating millennials will overtake the Baby boomer generation in this regard, making millennials the heaviest generation since current records began. Cancer Research UK reports that more than 70% of millennials will be overweight or obese by ages 35–45, in comparison to 50% of Baby boomers who were overweight or obese at the same ages.

Even though the majority of strokes affect people aged 65 or older and the probability of having a stroke doubles only every decade after the age of 55, anyone can suffer from a stroke at any age. A stroke occurs when the blood supply to the brain is disrupted, causing neurons to die within minutes, leading to irreparable brain damage, disability, or even death. Statistics from the Centers for Disease Control and Prevention (CDC), strokes are the fifth leading cause of death and a major factor behind disability in the United States. According to the National Strokes Association, the risk of having a stroke is increasing among young adults (those in their 20s and 30s) and even adolescents. During the 2010s, there was a 44% increase in the number of young people hospitalized for strokes. Health experts believe this development is due to a variety of reasons related to lifestyle choices, including obesity, smoking, alcoholism, and physical inactivity. Obesity is also linked to hypertension, diabetes, and high cholesterol levels. CDC data reveals that during the mid-2000s, about 28% of young Americans were obese; this number rose to 36% a decade later. Up to 80% of strokes can be prevented by making healthy lifestyle choices while the rest are due to factors beyond a person's control, namely age and genetic defects (such as congenital heart disease). In addition, between 30% and 40% of young patients suffered from cryptogenic strokes, or those with unknown causes.

According to a 2019 report from the American College of Cardiology, the prevalence of heart attacks among Americans under the age of 40 increased by an average rate of two percent per year in the previous decade. About one in five patients suffered from a heart attack came from this age group. This is despite the fact that Americans in general were less likely to suffer from heart attacks than before, due in part to a decline in smoking. The consequences of having a heart attack were much worse for young patients who also had diabetes. Besides the common risk factors of heart attacks, namely diabetes, high blood pressure, and family history, young patients also reported marijuana and cocaine intake, but less alcohol consumption.

Dental health
Millennials struggle with dental and oral health.  More than 30% of young adults have untreated tooth decay (the highest of any age group), 35% have trouble biting and chewing, and some 38% of this age group find life in general "less satisfying" due to teeth and mouth problems.

Sports and fitness

Fewer American millennials follow sports than their Generation X predecessors, with a McKinsey survey finding that 38 percent of millennials in contrast to 45 percent of Generation X are committed sports fans. However, the trend is not uniform across all sports; the gap disappears for National Basketball Association, Ultimate Fighting Championship, English Premier League and college sports. For example, a survey in 2013 found that engagement with mixed martial arts had increased in the 21st century and was more popular than boxing and wrestling for Americans aged 18 to 34 years old, in contrast to those aged 35 and over who preferred boxing. In the United States, while the popularity of American football and the National Football League has declined among millennials, the popularity of Association football and Major League Soccer has increased more among millennials than for any other generation, and as of 2018 was the second most popular sport among those aged 18 to 34.

Regarding the sports participation by millennials, activities that are popular or emerging among millennials including boxing, cycling, running, and swimming, while other sports including golf are facing decline among millennials. The Physical Activity Council's 2018 Participation Report found that in the U.S., millennials were more likely than other generations to participate in water sports such as stand up paddling, board-sailing and surfing. According to the survey of 30,999 Americans, which was conducted in 2017, approximately half of U.S. millennials participated in high caloric activities while approximately one quarter were sedentary. The 2018 report from the Physical Activity Council found millennials were more active than Baby Boomers in 2017. Thirty-five percent of both millennials and Generation X were reported to be "active to a healthy level", with millennial's activity level reported as higher overall than that of Generation X in 2017.

Political views and participation

American millennials

Views 

A 2004 Gallup poll of Americans aged 13 to 17 found that 71% said their social and political views were more or less the same as those of their parents. 21% thought they were more liberal and 7% more conservative. According to demographer and public policy analyst Philip Longman, "even among baby boomers, those who wound up having children have turned out to be remarkably similar to their parents in their attitudes about "family" values." In the postwar era, most returning servicemen looked forward to "making a home and raising a family" with their wives and lovers, and for many men, family life was a source of fulfillment and a refuge from the stress of their careers. Life in the late 1940s and 1950s was centered about the family and the family was centered around children. Researchers found that while only 9% of teenagers who identified with the Republican Party considered themselves more conservative than their parents, compared to 77% who shared their parents' views, 25% of adolescents who identified with the Democratic Party and 28% of politically independent teens said they were more liberal than their parents. Another 2004 Gallup poll of the same age group found that a clear majority of teenagers considered themselves to be politically moderate, 56%. Only 7% and 18% deemed themselves very conservative or conservative, respectively, and 10% and 6% believed they were liberal or very liberal, respectively. (The bar plot roughly resembles a Gaussian distribution or an isosceles triangle centered around moderates. See right.) By comparing with a 2004 poll of Americans aged 18 and over, Gallup discovered that teens were substantially more moderate than adults (56% to 38%), less conservative (25% to 40%), and just about as liberal (16% to 19%). However, political scientist Elias Dinas discovered, by studying the results from the Political Socialisation Panel Study and further data from the United Kingdom and the United States, that while children born to politically engaged parents tended to be politically engaged themselves, those who absorbed their parents' views the earliest were also the most likely to abandon them later in life.

The Economist observed in 2013 that, like their British counterparts, millennials in the United States held more positive attitudes towards recognizing same-sex marriage than older demographic cohorts. However, a 2018 poll conducted by Harris on behalf of the LGBT advocacy group GLAAD found that despite being frequently described as the most tolerant segment of society, people aged 18 to 34—most millennials and the oldest members of Generation Z—have become less accepting LGBT individuals compared to previous years. In 2016, 63% of Americans in that age group said they felt comfortable interacting with members of the LGBT community; that number dropped to 53% in 2017 and then to 45% in 2018. On top of that, more people reported discomfort learning that a family member was LGBT (from 29% in 2017 to 36% in 2018), having a child learning LGBT history (30% to 39%), or having an LGBT doctor (27% to 34%). Harris found that young women were driving this development; their overall comfort levels dived from 64% in 2017 to 52% in 2018. In general, the fall of comfort levels was the steepest among people aged 18 to 34 between 2016 and 2018. (Seniors aged 72 or above became more tolerant of LGBT doctors or having their (grand) children taking LGBT history lessons during the same period, albeit with a bump in discomfort levels in 2017.) Results from this Harris poll were released on the 50th anniversary of the riots that broke out in Stonewall Inn, New York City, in June 1969, thought to be the start of the LGBT rights movement. At that time, homosexuality was considered a mental illness or a crime in many U.S. states.

In 2018, Gallup conducted a survey of almost 14,000 Americans from all 50 states and the District of Columbia aged 18 and over on their political sympathies. They found that overall, younger adults tended to lean liberal while older adults tilted conservative. More specifically, groups with strong conservative leanings included the elderly, residents of the Midwest and the South, and people with some or no college education. Groups with strong liberal leanings were adults with advanced degrees, whereas those with moderate liberal leanings included younger adults (18 to 29 and 30 to 49), women, and residents of the East. Gallup found little variations by income groups compared to the national average. Among adults between the ages of 18 and 29—older Generation Z and younger millennials—Gallup found that 30% identified as liberals, 40% as moderates, and 26% as conservatives. Among adults aged 30 to 49—older millennials and younger Generation X—they found that 30% considered themselves liberals, 37% moderates, and 29% conservatives.(See above.) Between 1992 and 2018, the number of people identifying as liberals steadily increased, 17% to 26%, mainly at the expense of the group identifying as moderates. Meanwhile, the proportion of conservatives remained largely unchanged, albeit with fluctuations. Between 1994 and 2018, the number of members of the Democratic Party identifying as liberal rose from 25% to 51%, as the number of both moderates and conservatives gradually fell. Liberals became a majority in this political party for the first time in 2018. During the same period, in the Republican Party, the proportion of people calling themselves conservatives climbed from 58% to 73% while the numbers of moderates and liberals both dropped. In other words, this political party saw its conservative majority expanding. Meanwhile, among political independents, the percentage of moderates, the dominant group, remained largely unchanged.2018 surveys of American teenagers 13 to 17 and adults aged 18 or over conducted by the Pew Research Center found that millennials and Generation Z held similar views on various political and social issues. More specifically, 56% of millennials believed that climate change is real and is due to human activities while only 8% reject the scientific consensus on climate change. 64% wanted the government to play a more active role in solving their problems. 65% were indifferent towards pre-nuptial cohabitation. 48% considered single motherhood to be neither a positive or a negative for society. 61% saw increased ethnic or racial diversity as good for society. 47% did the same for same-sex marriage, and 53% interracial marriage. (See chart.) In most cases, millennials tended hold quite different views from the Silent Generation, with the Baby Boomers and Generation X in between. In the case of financial responsibility in a two-parent household, though, majorities from across the generations answered that it should be shared, with 58% for the Silent Generation, 73% for the Baby Boomers, 78% for Generation X, and 79% for both the millennials and Generation Z. Across all the generations surveyed, at least 84% thought that both parents ought to be responsible for rearing children. Very few thought that fathers should be the ones mainly responsible for taking care of children.

In 2015, a Pew Research study found 40% of millennials in the United States supported government restriction of public speech offensive to minority groups. Support for restricting offensive speech was lower among older generations, with 27% of Gen Xers, 24% of Baby Boomers, and only 12% of the Silent Generation supporting such restrictions. Pew Research noted similar age related trends in the United Kingdom, but not in Germany and Spain, where millennials were less supportive of restricting offensive speech than older generations. In France, Italy, and Poland no significant age differences were observed. In the U.S. and UK during the mid-2010s, younger millennials brought changes to higher education via drawing attention to microaggressions and advocating for implementation of safe spaces and trigger warnings in the university setting. Critics of such changes have raised concerns regarding their impact on free speech, asserting these changes can promote censorship, while proponents have described these changes as promoting inclusiveness.

A 2018 Gallup poll found that people aged 18 to 29 have a more favorable view of socialism than capitalism, 51% to 45%. Nationally, 56% of Americans prefer capitalism compared to 37% who favor socialism. Older Americans consistently prefer capitalism to socialism. Whether the current attitudes of millennials and Generation Z on capitalism and socialism will persist or dissipate as they grow older remains to be seen.

Gallup polls conducted in 2019 revealed that 62% of people aged 18 to 29—older members of Generation Z and younger millennials—support giving women access to abortion while 33% opposed. In general, the older someone was, the less likely that they supported abortion. 56% of people aged 65 or over did not approve of abortion compared to 37% who did. (See chart to the right.) Gallup found in 2018 that nationwide, Americans are split on the issue of abortion, with equal numbers of people considering themselves "pro-life" or "pro-choice", 48%.

In his doctoral dissertation submitted in 2003, social psychologist Jason Weeden conducted statistical analyses on general-public and undergraduate datasets and reached conclusions supporting the hypothesis that attitudes towards abortion are more strongly predicted by mating-relevant variables than by variables related to views on the sanctity of life. Some evolutionary psychologists and sociologists believe that the various mating strategies are in direct strategic conflict—a zero-sum game—and as such can influence political persuasion. For instance, the stability of long-term partnerships may be threatened by the availability of short-term sexual opportunities. Therefore, public policy measures that impose costs on casual sexual intercourse may benefit people pursuing long-term mating strategies by reducing the availability of short-term mating opportunities outside of committed relationships. Such policies include the prohibition of abortion and of recreational drug use. This relationship remained strong even when controlling for personality traits, political orientation, and moral values. By contrast, nonsexual variables typically associated with attitudes towards drug legalization were strongly attenuated or eliminated when controlling for sexuality-related measures. These findings were replicated in Belgium, Japan, and the Netherlands.

Polls conducted by Gallup and the Pew Research Center found that support for stricter gun laws among people aged 18 to 29 and 18 to 36, respectively, is statistically no different from that of the general population. According to Gallup, 57% of Americans are in favor of stronger gun control legislation. In a 2017 poll, Pew found that among the age group 18 to 29, 27% personally owned a gun and 16% lived with a gun owner, for a total of 43% living in a household with at least one gun. Nationwide, a similar percentage of American adults lived in a household with a gun (41%).

In 2019, the Pew Research Center interviewed over 2,000 Americans aged 18 and over on their views of various components of the federal government. They found that 54% of the people between the ages of 18 and 29 wanted larger government and larger compared to 43% who preferred smaller government and fewer services. Meanwhile, 46% of those between the ages of 30 and 49 favored larger government compared to 49% who picked the other option. Older people were more likely to dislike larger government. Overall, the American people remain divided over the size and scope of government, with 48% preferring smaller government with fewer services and 46% larger government and more services. They found that the most popular federal agencies were the U.S. Postal Service (90% favorable), the National Park Service (86%), NASA (81%), the CDC (80%), the FBI (70%), the Census Bureau (69%), the SSA (66%), the CIA, and the Federal Reserve (both 65%). There is very little to no partisan divide on the Postal Service, the National Park Service, NASA, the CIA, the Census Bureau.

According to a 2019 CBS News poll on 2,143 U.S. residents, 72% of Americans 18 to 44 years of age—Generations X, Y (millennials), and Z—believed that it is a matter of personal responsibility to tackle climate change while 61% of older Americans did the same. In addition, 42% of American adults under 45 years old thought that the U.S. could realistically transition to 100% renewable energy by 2050 while 29% deemed it unrealistic and 29% were unsure. Those numbers for older Americans are 34%, 40%, and 25%, respectively. Differences in opinion might be due to education as younger Americans are more likely to have been taught about climate change in schools than their elders. As of 2019, only 17% of electricity in the U.S. is generated from renewable energy, of which, 7% is from hydroelectric dams, 6% from wind turbines, and 1% solar panels. There are no rivers for new dams. Meanwhile, nuclear power plants generate about 20%, but their number is declining as they are being deactivated but not replaced.

In early 2019, Harvard University's Institute of Politics Youth Poll asked voters aged 18 to 29—younger millennials and the first wave of Generation Z—what they would like to be priorities for U.S. foreign policy. They found that the top issues for these voters were countering terrorism and protecting human rights (both 39%), and protecting the environment (34%). Preventing nuclear proliferation and defending U.S. allies were not as important to young American voters. The Poll found that support for single-payer universal healthcare and free college dropped, down 8% to 47% and down 5% to 51%, respectively, if cost estimates were provided.

Votes 

Millennials are more willing to vote than previous generations when they were at the same age. With voter rates being just below 50% for the four presidential cycles before 2017, they have already surpassed members of Generation X of the same age who were at just 36%.

Pew Research described millennials as playing a significant role in the election of Barack Obama as President of the United States. Millennials were between 12 and 27 during the 2008 U.S. presidential election. That year, the number of voters aged 18 to 29 who chose the Democratic candidate was 66%, a record since 1980. The total share of voters who backed the President's party was 53%, another record. For comparison, only 31% of voters in that age group backed John McCain, who got only 46% of the votes. Among millennials, Obama received votes from 54% of whites, 95% of blacks, and 72% of Hispanics. There was no significant difference between those with college degrees and those without, but millennial women were more likely to vote for Obama than men (69% vs. 62%). Among voters between the ages of 18 and 29, 45% identified with the Democratic Party while only 26% sided with the Republican Party, a gap of 19%. Back in 2000, the two main American political parties split the vote of this age group. This was a significant shift in the American political landscape. Millennials not only provided their votes but also the enthusiasm that marked the 2008 election. They volunteered in political campaigns and donated money. But that millennial enthusiasm all but vanished by the next election cycle while older voters showed more interest. In 2012, when Americans reelected Barack Obama, the voter participation gap between people above the age of 65 and those aged 18 to 24 was 31%. Pew polls conducted a year prior showed that while millennials preferred Barack Obama to Mitt Romney (61% to 37%), members of the Silent Generation leaned towards Romney rather than Obama (54% to 41%). But when looking at white millennials only, Pew found that Obama's advantage which he enjoyed in 2008 ceased to be, as they were split between the two candidates.

Although millennials are one of the largest voting blocs in the United States, their voting turnout rates have been subpar. Between the mid-2000s and the mid-2010s, millennial voting participation was consistently below those of their elders, fluctuating between 46% and 51%. For comparison, turnout rates for Generation X and the Baby Boomers rose during the same period, 60% to 69% and 41% to 63%, respectively, while those of the oldest of voters remained consistently at 69% or more. Millennials may still be a potent force at the ballot box, but it may be years before their participation rates reach their numerical potential as young people are consistently less likely to vote than their elders. In addition, despite the hype surrounding the political engagement and possible record turnout among young voters, millennials' voting power is even weaker than first appeared due to the comparatively higher number of them who are non-citizens (12%, as of 2019), according to William Frey of the Brookings Institution.

In general, the phenomenon of growing political distrust and de-alignment in the United States is similar to what has been happening in Europe since the last few decades of the twentieth century, even though events like the Watergate scandal or the threatened impeachment of President Bill Clinton are unique to the United States. Such an atmosphere depresses turnouts among younger voters. Among voters in the 18-to-24 age group, turnout dropped from 51% in 1964 to 38% in 2012. Although people between the ages of 25 and 44 were more likely to vote, their turnout rate followed a similarly declining trend during the same period. Political scientists Roger Eatwell and Matthew Goodwin argued that it was therefore unrealistic for Hillary Clinton to expect high turnout rates among millennials in 2016. This political environment also makes voters more likely to consider political outsiders such as Bernie Sanders and Donald Trump. The Brookings Institution predicted that after 2016, millennials could affect how politics is conducted in the two-party system of the United States, given that they were more likely to identify as liberals or conservatives than Democrats or Republicans, respectively. In particular, while Trump supporters were markedly enthusiastic about their chosen candidate, the number of young voters identifying with the GOP has not increased.

Bernie Sanders, a self-proclaimed democratic socialist and Democratic candidate in the 2016 United States presidential election, was the most popular candidate among millennial voters in the primary phase, having garnered more votes from people under 30 in 21 states than the major parties' candidates, Donald Trump and Hillary Clinton, did combined. According to the Brookings Institution, turnout among voters aged 18 to 29 in the 2016 election was 50%. Hillary Clinton won 55% of the votes from this age group while Donald Trump secured 37%. Polls conducted right before the election showed that millennial blacks and Hispanics were concerned about a potential Trump presidency. By contrast, Trump commanded support among young whites, especially men. There was also an enthusiasm gap for the two main candidates. While 32% of young Trump supporters felt excited about the possibility of him being President, only 18% of Clinton supporters said the same about her. The Bookings Institution found that among Trump voters in the 18-to-29 age group, 15% were white women with college degrees, 18% were the same without, 14% were white men with college degrees, and 32% were the same without, for a grand total of 79%. These groups were only 48% of Clinton voters of the same age range in total. On the other hand, a total of 52% of Clinton voters aged 18 to 29 were non-whites with college degrees (17%) and non-whites without them (35%). Clinton's chances of success were hampered by low turnouts among minorities and millennials with university degrees and students. Meanwhile, Trump voters included 41% of white millennials. These people tended to be non-degree holders with full-time jobs and were markedly less likely to be financially insecure than those who did not support Trump. Contrary to the claim that young Americans felt comfortable with the ongoing transformation of the ethnic composition of their country due to immigration, not all of them approve of this change despite the fact that they are an ethnically diverse cohort. In the end, Trump won more votes from whites between the ages of 18 and 29 than early polls suggested.

As is the case with many European countries, empirical evidence poses real challenges to the popular argument that the surge of nationalism and populism is an ephemeral phenomenon due to "angry white old men" who would inevitably be replaced by younger and more liberal voters. Especially since the 1970s, working-class voters, who had previously formed the backbone of support for the New Deal introduced by President Franklin D. Roosevelt, have been turning away from the left-leaning Democratic Party in favor of the right-leaning Republican Party. As the Democratic Party attempted to make itself friendlier towards the university-educated and women during the 1990s, more blue-collar workers and non-degree holders left. Political scientist Larry Bartels argued because about one quarter of Democrat supporters held social views more in-tune with Republican voters and because there was no guarantee millennials would maintain their current political attitudes due to life-cycle effects, this process of political re-alignment would likely continue. As is the case with Europe, there are potential pockets of support for national populism among younger generations.

A Reuters-Ipsos survey of 16,000 registered voters aged 18 to 34 conducted in the first three months of 2018 (and before the 2018 midterm election) showed that overall support for Democratic Party among such voters fell by nine percent between 2016 and 2018 and that an increasing number favored the Republican Party's approach to the economy. Pollsters found that white millennials, especially men, were driving this change. In 2016, 47% of young whites said they would vote for the Democratic Party, compared to 33% for the Republican Party, a gap of 14% in favor of the Democrats. But in 2018, that gap vanished, and the corresponding numbers were 39% for each party. For young white men the shift was even more dramatic. In 2016, 48% said they would vote for the Democratic Party and 36% for the Republican Party. But by 2018, those numbers were 37% and 46%, respectively. This is despite the fact that almost two thirds of young voters disapproved of the performance of Republican President Donald J. Trump. According to the Pew Research Center, only 27% of millennials approved of the Trump presidency while 65% disapproved that year.

British millennials

In their youth during the early 21st century, British millennials were generally considered a relatively politically disengaged generation. Turnout at United Kingdom general elections fell sharply after the millennium with involvement lowest among the young. A majority of 18 to 24 year olds failed to vote in the 2001, 2005 and 2010 general elections with participation reaching a record low among this age group of 38.2% in 2005. The British Social Attitudes Survey suggested that the proportion of people in their 20s and early 30s who identified with a particular political party fell from 85% in 1983 to 66% in 2012. Later, various political events such as the 2014 Scottish Independence referendum, 2016 European Union membership referendum and 2017 general election were seen as sparking the interest of the millennial cohort though turnout at elections has remained below mid-to-late 20th century levels.

The Economist reported in 2013 that surveys of political attitudes among millennials in the United Kingdom revealed that they held more liberal views on social and economic matters than older demographic groups. They favored individual liberty, small government, low taxes, limited welfare programs, and personal responsibility. While support for increased welfare programs for the poor at the cost of potentially higher taxes has declined steadily since the 1980s among all living demographic cohorts in the U.K., Generation Y disapproved of such spending schemes the most, according to data from Ipsos MORI and the British Social Attitudes Survey. On the other hand, they had a more relaxed attitude towards alcohol consumption, euthanasia, same-sex marriage and the legalization of drugs. They disliked immigration, though less than their elders. They were more likely than their elders to support public debt reduction. They cared about the environment, but not at the expense of economic prosperity, and they supported privatizing utilities. In other words, they were classical liberals or libertarians. Ipsos pollster Ben Page told The Economist, "Every successive generation is less collectivist than the last." 
A 2013 YouGov poll of almost a thousand people aged 18 to 24 in the United Kingdom found that 73% in total supported the legalization of same-sex marriage and only 15% opposed. 41% either strongly or somewhat supported legalizing "soft" drugs, such as cannabis while 46% strongly or somewhat opposed. The five most popular political parties for young Britons were the Labour Party (23%), the Conservative Party (12%), the Liberal Democratic Party (7%), the Green Party (7%), and the United Kingdom Independence Party (6%). 19% of British youths identified with no party whatsoever. When asked which politician they admired, 77% picked the "none" option, followed by Boris Johnson (4%). 59% had signed a petition. 47% had voted in a local or national election, and 19% had contacted a politician representing them. Overall, 60% had an unfavorable view of the British political system. 12% thought British immigration laws were too tough, 54% said they were too lax, and 16% deemed them appropriate. About one third opined that taxes and public spending were too high. 22% said they were insufficient and one fifth thought they were about right. 34% believed welfare benefits were too generous and should be cut. 22% argued they were not enough and should be increased and 24% thought they struck the right balance. Almost three quarters agreed that the welfare system was frequently abused and 63% thought those who genuinely needed it were branded as "scroungers". A total of 40% were proud and 46% not proud of Britain's current welfare system. Some 39% thought that the current welfare system is financially untenable and needs to be slashed while 49% thought the status quo is fine. A total of 65% were either very or fairly proud of the United Kingdom Armed Forces, 62% the British Broadcasting Corporation (BBC), 77% the National Health Service (NHS). 57% thought that it would be possible to keep the NHS free at the point of service and 26% thought the NHS would eventually need to charge people in order to stay afloat.

According to a YouGov poll conducted right before the referendum on the possible departure of the United Kingdom from the European Union (Brexit) in 2016, almost three quarters of voters aged 18 to 24 opposed leaving the E.U. while just under one fifth supported leaving. 64% of Britons aged 25 to 29 and 61% between the ages of 30 to 35 supported remaining in the E.U. Meanwhile, 34% of pensioners wanted to remain and 59% wanted to leave. Older people were more likely to vote, and vote to leave. One of the reasons behind this generational gap is the fundamentally different environment that millennial voters grew up in. Many older voters came of age when Britain was a less ethnically diverse country, when collective memory of the British Empire and its victory in World War II was strong, when most people did not attend university, and spent a large part of their formative years in a society where abortion and homosexuality were illegal and the death penalty was in use. By contrast, millennials, many of whom supported the left-wing politician Jeremy Corbyn, grew up at a time when the United Kingdom was a member of the EU, when graduation from university was common, and when the political consensus favoured immigration and EU membership. But age is not the only reason, as voter data shows.

By analyzing polling data, the Wall Street Journal found that 19% of voters aged 18 to 24 either did not vote or were unsure, as did 17% of voters aged 25 to 49. Meanwhile, 10% of voters aged 50 to 64 and 6% of voters aged 65 and over abstained or were undecided. Overall, 52% (or 17.4 million) of British voters chose to leave and 48% (or 16.1 million) to remain in the E.U. Voter turnout was 72%, a sizeable figure, though not the largest on record after World War II, which was 84% in 1950. However, only 28.8 million people voted in 1950, compared to about 33.6 million in 2016. Still, it is the highest since 1992, as of 2019. That turnouts in millennial-majority constituencies were subpar while those in working-class neighborhoods were above average contributed to the outcome of the Brexit Referendum. Public opinion polls often underestimated the political power of working-class voters because these people are typically underrepresented in samples. Commonly made predictions of a victory for the Remain side created a sense of complacency among those who wanted the U.K. to remain in the European Union and a sense of urgency among those who wanted to leave.

While young people tend to view the European Union more favorably, it is erroneous to believe that they all oppose Brexit for all the same reasons. For example, someone from Northern Ireland is probably more concerned about the prospects of a physical border between that part of the U.K. and the Republic of Ireland than, say, losing the ability to study abroad in continental Europe under the E.U.-sponsored Erasmus Program. Nor is it accurate to say that the proponents of Brexit form a homogeneous group. Besides many wealthy retirees, immigrants, and children of immigrants, one third of university graduates voted to leave. As of 2017, about half of young British adults under 30 years of age have attended or are attending an institution of higher education, a number higher than previous generations.

A YouGov poll conducted in the spring of 2018 revealed that 58% of Britons between the ages of 25 and 49 thought that immigration to their country was "too high", compared to 41% of those aged 18 to 24.

Despite reports of a surge in turnouts among young voters in the 2015 and 2017 United Kingdom general elections, statistical scrutiny by the British Elections Study revealed that the margin of error was too large to determine whether or not there was a significant increase or decrease in the number of young participants. In both cases, turnouts among those aged 18 to 24 was between 40% and 50%. Winning the support of young people does not necessarily translate to increasing young voters' turnouts, and positive reactions on social media may not lead to success at the ballot box. Initial reports of a youth surge came from constituency-level survey data, which has a strong chance of over-representing voters rather than the Kingdom as a whole. In addition, higher turnouts generally came from constituencies where there were already large proportions of young people, both toddlers and young adults, and such surges did not necessarily come from young voters. In 2017, there was indeed an increase in overall voter turnout, but only by 2.5%. A consistent trend in the U.K. and many other countries is that older people are more likely to vote than their younger countrymen, and they tend to vote for more right-leaning (or conservative) candidates.

A 2021 report noted that the popular conception of British Millennials relationship with politics changed around the late 2010s from indifference to left-wing, socially liberal attitudes or "millennial socialism". The report which examined polling of millennials and adult Generation Z members political attitudes found clear negativity towards the idea of capitalism and positivity towards the idea of socialism in the abstract. Their was also strong support for various socialist arguments though capitalist counter-arguments often also received plurality support. Commentators sometimes suggest that these attitudes are a natural aspect of youth which will pass as these people age though their some evidence against this. A analysis a British Election Study results for the 1964 to 2019 general elections found that whilst earlier age groups became more likely to vote Conservative as they got older millennials did not appear to be progressing in the same direction and an article on the analysis described them as "by far the least conservative 35-year-olds in recorded history." The 2021 report also commented on this argument that:

Canadian millennials
Historically, political participation among young Canadian voters has been low, no higher than 40%. However, the 2015 federal election was an exception, when 57% of the people aged 18 to 34 voted. Canadian millennials played a key role in the election of Justin Trudeau as Prime Minister of Canada. While Stephen Harper and the Conservative Party received approximately the same number of votes as they did in 2011, the surge in the youth vote was enough to push Trudeau to the top. His core campaign message centered around gender equality, tolerance, legalizing marijuana, addressing climate change, and governmental transparency while Harper focused on tax cuts. Nevertheless, political scientist Melanee Thomas at the University of Calgary warned that the electoral power of this demographic group should not be overestimated, since millennials do not vote as a single bloc. Even though millennials tend to vote for left-leaning candidates, certain items from right-leaning platforms can resonate with them, such as high but affordable standards of living.

A 2018 survey of 4,000 Canadian millennials by Abacus Data found that 54% of the people asked favored socialism and 46% capitalism. Most want to address climate change, alleviate poverty, and adopt a more open immigration policy, but most important were micro-economic concerns, such as housing affordability, the cost of living, healthcare, and job-market uncertainties. Housing affordability is a key political issue for young Canadians, regardless of where they live, urban, suburban, or rural Canada. Because clear majorities are in favor of government interventionism, they generally tolerate deficit spending.

According to Sean Simpsons of Ipsos, people are more likely to vote when they have more at stake, such as children to raise, homes to maintain, and income taxes to pay.

French millennials

In France, while year-long mandatory military service for men was abolished in 1996 by President Jacques Chirac, who wanted to build a professional all-volunteer military, all citizens between 17 and 25 years of age must still participate in the Defense and Citizenship Day (JAPD: Journée d'Appel de Préparation à la Défense, now Journée Défense et Citoyenneté), when they are introduced to the French Armed Forces, and take language tests. A 2015 IFOP poll revealed that 80% of the French people supported some kind of mandatory service, military, or civilian. The rationale for the reintroduction of national service was that "France needs powerful tools to help promote integration, mix young people of different social backgrounds and levels, and to instill Republican values and national cohesion". At the same time, returning to conscription was also popular; supporters included 90% of the UMP party, 89% of the National Front (now the National Rally), 71% of the Socialist Party, and 67% of people aged 18 to 24, even though they would be affected the most. This poll was conducted after the Charlie Hebdo terrorist attacks. In previous years, it averaged 60%.

Other European millennials 
The period between the middle to the late twentieth century could be described as an era of "mass politics", meaning people were generally loyal to a chosen political party. Political debates were mostly about economic questions, such as wealth redistribution, taxation, jobs, and the role of government. But as countries transitioned from having industrial economies to a post-industrial and globalized world, and as the twentieth century became the twenty-first, topics of political discourse changed to other questions and polarization due to competing values intensified. While this new period of political evolution was taking place, a new cohort of voters—millennials—entered the scene and these people tend to think differently about the old issues than their elders. Moreover, they are less inclined than previous generations to identify (strongly) with a particular political party.

But scholars such as Ronald Inglehart traced the roots of this new "culture conflict" all the way back to the 1960s, which witnessed the emergence of the Baby Boomers, who were generally university-educated middle-class voters. Whereas their predecessors in the twentieth century—the Lost Generation, the Greatest Generation, and the Silent Generation—had to endure severe poverty and world wars, focused on economic stability or simple survival, the Baby Boomers benefited from an economically secure, if not affluent, upbringing and as such tended to be drawn to "post-materialist" values. Major topics for political discussion at that time were things like the sexual revolution, civil rights, nuclear weaponry, ethnocultural diversity, environmental protection, European integration, and the concept of "global citizenship". Some mainstream parties, especially the social democrats, moved to the left in order to accommodate these voters. In the twenty-first century, supporters of post-materialism lined up behind causes such as LGBT rights, climate change, multiculturalism, and various political campaigns on social media. Inglehart called this the "Silent Revolution". But not everyone approved, giving rise to what Piero Ignazi called the "Silent Counter-Revolution". 

The university-educated and non-degree holders have very different upbringing, live very different lives, and as such hold very different values. Education plays a role in this "culture conflict" as national populism appeals most strongly to those who finished high school but did not graduate from university while the experience of higher education has been shown to be linked to having a socially liberal mindset. Degree holders tend to favor tolerance, individual rights, and group identities whereas non-degree holders lean towards conformity, and maintaining order, customs, and traditions. While the number of university-educated Western voters continues to grow, in many democracies non-degree holders still form a large share of the electorate. According to the OECD, in 2016, the average share of voters between the ages of 25 and 64 without tertiary education in the European Union was 66% of the population. In Italy, it exceeded 80%. In many major democracies, such as France, although the representation of women and ethnic minorities in the corridors of power has increased, the same cannot be said for the working-class and non-degree holders.

By analyzing voter data, political scientists Roger Eatwell and Matthew Goodwin came to the conclusion that the popular narrative that the rise of national-populist movements seen across much of the Western world is due largely to angry old white men who would soon be replaced by younger and more liberal voters is flawed. In many European democracies, national-populist politicians and political parties tend to be the most popular among voters below the age of 40. In France, Marine Le Pen and her National Rally (formerly the National Front) won more votes from people between the ages of 18 and 35 during the first round of the 2017 Presidential election than any other candidates. In Italy, Matteo Salvini and his League have a base of support with virtually no generational gap. In Austria, more than one in two men between the ages of 18 and 29 voted for the Freedom Party in 2016. The Alternative for Germany's strongest support came not from senior citizens but voters between 25 and 50 years of age. The Sweden Democrats were the second most popular political party for voters aged 18 to 24 and the most popular for those between 35 and 54 before the 2018 Swedish general election. According to SVT, 13% of those aged 18–21 voted for the Sweden Democrats in 2018 and 14% of those aged 22–30, making them the third largest party in both cases. That figure rose to 21% of 31-64 year-olds, making them second biggest in that age group.

Preferred modes of transportation

Millennials in the U.S. were initially not keen on getting a driver's license or owning a vehicle thanks to new licensing laws and the state of the economy when they came of age, but the oldest among them have already begun buying cars in great numbers. In 2016, millennials purchased more cars and trucks than any living generation except the Baby Boomers; in fact, millennials overtook Baby Boomers in car ownership in California that year. A working paper by economists Christopher Knittel and Elizabeth Murphy then at the Massachusetts Institute of Technology and the National Bureau of Economic Research analyzed data from the U.S. Department of Transportation's National Household Transportation Survey, the U.S. Census Bureau, and American Community Survey in order to compare the driving habits of the Baby Boomers, Generation X, and the oldest millennials (born between 1980 and 1984). That found that on the surface, the popular story is true: American millennials on average own 0.4 fewer cars than their elders. But when various factors—including income, marital status, number of children, and geographical location—were taken into account, such a distinction ceased to be. In addition, once those factors are accounted for, millennials actually drive longer distances than the Baby Boomers. Economic forces, namely low gasoline prices, higher income, and suburban growth, result in millennials having an attitude towards cars that is no different from that of their predecessors. An analysis of the National Household Travel Survey by the State Smart Transportation Initiative revealed that higher-income millennials drive less than their peers probably because they are able to afford the higher costs of living in large cities, where they can take advantage of alternative modes of transportation, including public transit and ride-hailing services.

According to the Pew Research Center, young people are more likely to ride public transit. In 2016, 21% of adults aged 18 to 21 took public transit on a daily, almost daily, or weekly basis. By contrast, this number of all U.S. adults was 11%. Nationwide, about three quarters of American commuters drive their own cars. Also according to Pew, 51% of U.S. adults aged 18 to 29 used Lyft or Uber in 2018 compared to 28% in 2015. That number for all U.S. adults were 15% in 2015 and 36% in 2018. In general, users tend to be urban residents, young (18–29), university graduates, and high income earners ($75,000 a year or more).

Religious beliefs

In virtually all Western countries, the proportions of religious people began declining when the first wave of the Baby Boomers entered adulthood in the 1960s and has declined ever since. Children of the Baby Boomers tend to be even less religious than the Baby Boomers themselves. Even the United States of America, which is quite religious by Western standards, is not an exception to this trend, though the decline there was slower than in Europe. However, there have been reports of manifestations of renewed traditionalism in the West. Millennials often describe themselves as "spiritual but not religious" and will sometimes turn to astrology, meditation or mindfulness techniques possibly to seek meaning or a sense of control. According to 2015 analysis of the European Values Study in the Handbook of Children and Youth Studies "the majority of young respondents in Europe claimed that they belonged to a Christian denomination", and "in most countries, the majority of young people believe in God". However, according to the same analysis a "dramatic decline" in religious affiliation among young respondents happened in Great Britain, Sweden, France, Italy and Denmark. By contrast an increase in religious affiliation happened among young respondents in Russia, Ukraine, and Romania. 

According to a 2013 YouGov poll of almost a thousand Britons between the ages of 18 and 24, 56% said they had never attended a place of worship, other than for a wedding or a funeral. 25% said they believed in God, 19% in a "spiritual greater power" while 38% said they did not believe in God nor any other "greater spiritual power". The poll also found that 14% thought religion was a "cause of good" in the world while 41% thought religion was "the cause of evil". 34% answered "neither". The British Social Attitudes Survey found that 71% of British 18–24 year-olds were not religious, with just 3% affiliated to the once-dominant Church of England, and 5% say they are Catholics, and 14% say they belong to other Christian denomination.

In the U.S., millennials are the least likely to be religious when compared to older generations. There is a trend towards irreligion that has been increasing since the 1940s. According to a 2012 study by Pew Research, 32 percent of Americans aged 18–29 are irreligious, as opposed to 21 percent aged 30–49, 15 percent aged 50–64, and only 9 percent born aged 65 and above. A 2005 study looked at 1,385 people aged 18 to 25 and found that more than half of those in the study said that they pray regularly before a meal. One-third said that they discussed religion with friends, attended religious services, and read religious material weekly. Twenty-three percent of those studied did not identify themselves as religious practitioners. A 2010 Pew Research Center study on millennials shows that of those between 18 and 29 years old, only 3% of these emerging adults self-identified as "atheists" and only 4% self-identified as "agnostics". While 68% of those between 18 and 29 years old self-identified as "Christians" (43% self-identified as Protestants and 22% self-identified as Catholics). Overall, 25% of millennials are "Nones" and 75% are religiously affiliated. In 2011, social psychologists Jason Weeden, Adam Cohen, and Douglas Kenrick analyzed survey data sets from the American general public and university undergraduates and discovered that sociosexual tendencies—that is, mating strategies—play a more important role in determining the level of religiousness than any other social variables. In fact, when controlled for family structure and sexual attitudes, variables such as age, sex, and moral beliefs on sexuality substantially drop in significance in determining religiosity. In the context of the United States, religiousness facilitates seeking and maintaining high-fertility, marriage-oriented, heterosexual monogamous relationships. As such, the central goals of religious attendance are reproduction and child-rearing. However, this Reproductive Religiosity Model does not necessarily apply to other countries. In Singapore, for example, they found no relationships between the religiousness of Buddhists and their attitudes towards sexuality.
A 2016 U.S. study found that church attendance during young adulthood was 41% among Generation Z, 18% for the millennials, 21% for Generation X, and 26% for the Baby Boomers when they were at the same age. A 2016 survey by Barna and Impact 360 Institute on about 1,500 Americans aged 13 and up suggests that the proportion of atheists and agnostics was 21% among Generation Z, 15% for millennials, 13% for Generation X, and 9% for Baby Boomers. 59% of Generation Z were Christians (including Catholics), as were 65% for the millennials, 65% for Generation X, and 75% for the Baby Boomers. 41% of teens believed that science and the Bible are fundamentally at odds with one another, with 27% taking the side of science and 17% picking religion. For comparison, 45% of millennials, 34% of Generation X, and 29% of the Baby Boomers believed such a conflict exists. 31% of Generation Z believed that science and religion refer to different aspects of reality, on par with millennials and Generation X (both 30%), and above the Baby Boomers (25%). 28% of Generation Z thought that science and religion are complementary, compared to 25% of millennials, 36% of Generation X, and 45% for Baby Boomers.

Globally, religion is in decline in North America and Western Europe, but is growing in the rest of the world.  According to a 2018 study by the Pew Research Center, 29% of Muslims, 27% of Hindus, 26% of Christians, 24% of religiously unaffiliated and 23% of Buddhists were aged 15 to 29 years. In 2018, Muslims had a median age of 23, Hindus 26, Christians 30, Buddhists and the religiously unaffiliated 34, and Jews 36. For comparison, the median age of the global population was 28 in 2018. Overall, Christians have a fertility rate of 2.6, and Muslims 2.9. Islam is the world's fastest growing religion, primarily due to the average younger age and higher fertility rate of Muslims.

Between the late 1990s and the early 2000s, religious attendance nosedived 40% throughout England except in London, where 57% of Christians were in their 20s. Indeed, the deceleration of secularization is also apparent in other European cities with a large migrant population, such as Amsterdam, Brussels, Malmö, Marseilles, and Paris.

A 2017 study conducted by the Pew Research Center on 70 countries showed that between 2010 and 2015, among people aged 15 to 29, the irreligious grew by 23%, Muslims 0.3%, while Christians lost 0.7% due to religious conversion or switching. In particular, the unaffiliated gained eight million people and Muslims half a million while Christians lost nine million due to religious switching.

Social tendencies

Social circles 
In March 2014, the Pew Research Center issued a report about how "millennials in adulthood" are "detached from institutions and networked with friends". The report said millennials are somewhat more upbeat than older adults about America's future, with 49% of millennials saying the country's best years are ahead, though they're the first in the modern era to have higher levels of student loan debt and unemployment.

Courtship behavior 
In many countries, people have since the mid-twentieth century been increasingly looking for mates of the same socioeconomic status and educational attainment. The phenomenon of preferring mates with characteristics similar to one's own is known as assortative mating. Part of the reason growing economic and educational assortative mating was economic in nature. Innovations which became commercially available in the late twentieth century such as the washing machine and frozen food reduced the amount of time people needed to spend on housework, which diminished the importance of domestic skills. Moreover, by the early 2000s, it was less feasible for a couple with one spouse having no more than a high-school diploma to earn about the national average; on the other hand, couples both of whom had at least a bachelor's degree could expect to make a significant amount above the national average. People thus had a clear economic incentive to seek out a mate with at least as high a level of education in order to maximize their potential income. Another incentive for this kind of assortative mating lies in the future of the offspring. People have since the mid-twentieth century increasingly wanted intelligent and well-educated children, and marrying bright people who make a lot of money goes a long way in achieving that goal. Couples in the early twenty-first century tend to hold egalitarian rather than traditional views on gender roles. Modern marriage is more about companionship rather than bread-winning for the man and homemaking for the woman. American and Chinese youths are increasingly whether or not to marry according to their personal preferences rather than family, societal, or religious expectations.
As of 2016, 54% of Russian millennials were married.

According to the Chinese National Bureau of Statistics, the number of people getting married for the first time went from 23.8 million in 2013 to 13.9 million in 2019, a 41% drop. Meanwhile, the marriage rate continued its decline, 6.6 per 1,000 people, a 33% drop compared to 2013. These trends are due to multiple reasons. The one-child policy, introduced in 1979, has curbed the number of young people in China. On top of that, the traditional preference for sons has resulted in a marked gender imbalance; as of 2021, China has over 30 million "surplus" men.

In the 1990s, the Chinese government reformed higher education in order to increase access, whereupon significantly more young people, a slight majority of whom being women, have received a university degree. Consequently, many young women are now gainfully employed and financially secure. Traditional views on gender roles dictate that women be responsible for housework and childcare, regardless of their employment status. Workplace discrimination against women (with families) is commonplace; for example, an employer might be more skeptical towards a married woman with one child, fearing she might have another (as the one-child policy was rescinded in 2016) and take more maternity leave. Altogether, there is less incentive for young women to marry.

For young Chinese couples in general, the cost of living, especially the cost of housing in the big cities, is a serious obstacle to marriage. In addition, Chinese millennials are less keen on marrying than their predecessors as a result of cultural change.

Writing for The Atlantic in 2018, Kate Julian reported that among the countries that kept track of the sexual behavior of their citizens—Australia, Finland, Japan, the Netherlands, Sweden, the United Kingdom, and the United States—all saw a decline in the frequency of sexual intercourse among teenagers and young adults. Although experts disagree on the methodology of data analysis, they do believe that young people today are less sexually engaged than their elders, such as the baby boomers, when they were their age. This is despite the fact that online dating platforms allow for the possibility of casual sex, the wide availability of contraception, and the relaxation of attitudes towards sex outside of marriage.

A 2020 study published in the Journal of the American Medical Association (JAMA) by researchers from Indiana University in the United States and the Karolinska Institutet from Sweden found that during the first two decades of the twenty-first century, young Americans had sexual intercourse less frequently than in the past. Among men aged 18 to 24, the share of the sexually inactive increased from 18.9% between 2000 and 2002 to 30.9% between 2016 and 2018. Women aged 18 to 34 had sex less often as well. Reasons for this trend are manifold. People who were unemployed, only had part-time jobs, and students were the most likely to forego sexual experience while those who had higher income were stricter in mate selection. Psychologist Jean Twenge, who did not participate in the study, suggested that this might be due to "a broader cultural trend toward delayed development", meaning various adult activities are postponed. She noted that being economically dependent on one's parents discourages sexual intercourse. Other researchers noted that the rise of the Internet, computer games, and social media could play a role, too, since older and married couples also had sex less often. In short, people had many options. A 2019 study by the London School of Hygiene and Tropical Medicine found a similar trend in the United Kingdom. Although this trend precedes the COVID-19 pandemic, fear of infection is likely to fuel the trend the future, study co-author Peter Ueda told Reuters.

In a 2019 poll, the Pew Research Center found that about 47% American adults believed dating had become more difficult within the last decade or so, while only 19% said it became easier and 33% thought it was the same. Majorities of both men (65%) and women (43%) agreed that the #MeToo movement posed challenges for the dating market while 24% and 38%, respectively, thought it made no difference. In all, one in two of single adults were not looking for a romantic relationship. Among the rest, 10% were only interested in casual relationships, 14% wanted committed relationships only, and 26% were open to either kind. Among younger people (18 to 39), 27% wanted a committed relationship only, 15% casual dates only, and 58% either type of relationship. For those between the ages of 18 and 49, the top reasons for their decision to avoid dating were having more important priorities in life (61%), preferring being single (41%), being too busy (29%), and pessimism about their chances of success (24%).

While most Americans found their romantic partners with the help of friends and family, younger adults were more likely to encounter them online than their elders, with 21% of those aged 18 to 29 and 15% of those aged 30 to 49 saying they met their current partners this way. For comparison, only 8% of those aged 50 to 64 and 5% of those aged 65 and over did the same. People aged 18 to 29 were most likely to have met their current partners in school while adults aged 50 and up were more likely to have met their partners at work. Among those in the 18 to 29 age group, 41% were single, including 51% of men and 32% of women. Among those in the 30 to 49 age group, 23% were single, including 27% of men and 19% of women. This reflects the general trend across the generations that men tend to marry later (and die earlier) than women.

Most single people, regardless of whether or not they were interested in dating, felt little to no pressure from their friends and family to seek a romantic partner. Young people, however, were under significant pressure compared to the sample average or older age groups. 53% of bachelors and spinsters aged 18 to 29 thought there was at least some pressure from society on them to find a partner, compared to 42% for people aged 30 to 49, 32% for people aged 50 to 64, and 21% for people aged 50 to 64.

Family life and offspring 
According to the Brookings Institution, the number of American mothers who never married ballooned between 1968, when they were extremely rare, and 2008, when they became much more common, especially among the less educated. In particular, in 2008, the number of mothers who never married with at least 16 years of education was 3.3%, compared to 20.1% of those who never graduated from high school. Unintended pregnancies were also higher among the less educated.

Research by the Urban Institute conducted in 2014, projected that if current trends continue, millennials will have a lower marriage rate compared to previous generations, predicting that by age 40, 31% of millennial women will remain single, approximately twice the share of their single Gen X counterparts. The data showed similar trends for males. A 2016 study from Pew Research showed millennials delay some activities considered rites of passage of adulthood with data showing young adults aged 18–34 were more likely to live with parents than with a relationship partner, an unprecedented occurrence since data collection began in 1880. Data also showed a significant increase in the percentage of young adults living with parents compared to the previous demographic cohort, Generation X, with 23% of young adults aged 18–34 living with parents in 2000, rising to 32% in 2014. Additionally, in 2000, 43% of those aged 18–34 were married or living with a partner, with this figure dropping to 32% in 2014. High student debt is described as one reason for continuing to live with parents, but may not be the dominant factor for this shift as the data shows the trend is stronger for those without a college education. Richard Fry, a senior economist for Pew Research said of millennials, "they're the group much more likely to live with their parents," further stating that "they're concentrating more on school, careers and work and less focused on forming new families, spouses or partners and children."According to a cross-generational study comparing millennials to Generation X conducted at Wharton School of Business, more than half of millennial undergraduates surveyed do not plan to have children. The researchers compared surveys of the Wharton graduating class of 1992 and 2012. In 1992, 78% of women planned to eventually have children dropping to 42% in 2012. The results were similar for male students. The research revealed among both genders the proportion of undergraduates who reported they eventually planned to have children had dropped in half over the course of a generation. Quest reported in March 2020 that, in Belgium, 11% of women and 16% of men between the ages of 25 and 35 did not want children and that in the Netherlands, 10% of 30-year-old women polled had decided against having children or having more children. A 2019 study revealed that among 191 Swedish men aged 20 to 50, 39 were not fathers and did not want to have children in the future (20.4%). Desire to have (more) children was not related to level of education, country of birth, sexual orientation or relationship status. Some Swedish men "passively" choose not to have children because they feel their life is already good as it is without bringing children to the world, and because they do not face the same amount of social pressure to have children the way voluntarily childless women do.

But as their economic prospects improve, most millennials in the United States say they desire marriage, children, and home ownership. Geopolitical analyst Peter Zeihan argued that because of the size of the millennial cohort relative to the size of the U.S. population and because they are having children, the United States will continue to maintain an economic advantage over most other developed nations, whose millennial cohorts are not only smaller than their those of their elders but are also not having as high a fertility rate. The prospects of any given country is constrained by its demography. Psychologist Jean Twenge and a colleague's analysis of data from the General Social Survey of 40,000 Americans aged 30 and over from the 1970s to the 2010s suggests that socioeconomic status (as determined by factors such as income, educational attainment, and occupational prestige), marriage, and happiness are positive correlated and that these relationships are independent of cohort or age. However, the data cannot tell whether marriage causes happiness or the other way around; correlation does not mean causation.

In the United States, between the late 1970s and the late 2010s, the shares of people who were married declined among the lower class (from 60% down to 33%) and the middle class (84% down to 66%), but remained steady among the upper class (~80%). In fact, it was the lower and middle classes that were driving the U.S. marriage rate down. Among Americans aged 25 to 39, the divorce rate per 1,000 married persons dropped from 30 to 24 between 1990 and 2015. For comparison, among those aged 50 and up, the divorce rate went from 5 in 1990 to 10 in 2015; that among people aged 40 to 49 increased from 18 to 21 per 1,000 married persons. In general, the level of education is a predictor of marriage and income. University graduates are more likely to get married but less likely to divorce.

Demographer and futurist Mark McCrindle suggested the name "Generation Alpha" (or Generation ) for the offspring of a majority of millennials, people born after Generation Z, noting that scientific disciplines often move to the Greek alphabet after exhausting the Roman alphabet. By 2016, the cumulative number of American women of the millennial generation who had given birth at least once reached 17.3 million. Globally, there are some two and a half million people belonging to Generation Alpha born every week and their number is expected to reach two billion by 2025. However, most of the human population growth in the 2010s comes from Africa and Asia, as nations in Europe and the Americas tend to have too few children to replace themselves. According to the United Nations, the global annual rate of growth has been declining steadily since the late twentieth century, dropping to about one percent in 2019. They also discovered that fertility rates were falling faster in the developing world than previously thought, and subsequently revised their projection of human population in 2050 down to 9.7 billion. Fertility rates have been falling around the world thanks to rising standards of living, better access to contraceptives, and improved educational and economic opportunities. The global average fertility rate was 2.4 in 2017, down from 4.7 in 1950.

Effects of intensifying assortative mating (discussed in the previous section) will likely be seen in the next generation, as parental income and educational level are positively correlated with children's success. In the United States, children from families in the highest income quintile are the most likely to live with married parents (94% in 2018), followed by children of the middle class (74%) and the bottom quintile (35%).

Living in the digital age, Millennial parents have taken plenty of photographs of their children, and have chosen both digital storage (e.g. Dropbox) or physical photo albums to preserve their memories.

Workplace attitudes
In 2008, author Ron Alsop called the millennials "Trophy Kids," a term that reflects a trend in competitive sports, as well as many other aspects of life, where mere participation is frequently enough for a reward. It has been reported that this is an issue in corporate environments. Some employers are concerned that millennials have too great expectations from the workplace. Some studies predict they will switch jobs frequently, holding many more jobs than Gen Xers due to their great expectations. Psychologist Jean Twenge reports data suggesting there are differences between older and younger millennials regarding workplace expectations, with younger millennials being "more practical" and "more attracted to industries with steady work and are more likely to say they are willing to work overtime" which Twenge attributes to younger millennials coming of age following the financial crisis of 2007–2008.

In 2010 the Journal of Business and Psychology, contributors Myers and Sadaghiani find millennials "expect close relationships and frequent feedback from supervisors" to be a main point of differentiation. Multiple studies observe millennials' associating job satisfaction with free flow of information, strong connectivity to supervisors, and more immediate feedback. Hershatter and Epstein, researchers from Emory University, argue many of these traits can be linked to millennials entering the educational system on the cusp of academic reform, which created a much more structured educational system. Some argue in the wake of these reforms, such as the No Child Left Behind Act, millennials have increasingly sought the aid of mentors and advisers, leading to 66% of millennials seeking a flat work environment.

Hershatter and Epstein also stress a growing importance on work-life balance. Studies show nearly one-third of students' top priority is to "balance personal and professional life". The Brain Drain Study shows nearly 9 out of 10 millennials place an importance on work-life balance, with additional surveys demonstrating the generation to favor familial over corporate values. Studies also show a preference for work-life balance, which contrasts to the Baby Boomers' work-centric attitude.

There is also a contention that the major differences are found solely between millennials and Generation X. Researchers from the University of Missouri and The University of Tennessee conducted a study based on measurement equivalence to determine if such a difference does in fact exist. The study looked at 1,860 participants who had completed the Multidimensional Work Ethic Profile (MWEP), a survey aimed at measuring identification with work-ethic characteristics, across a 12-year period spanning from 1996 to 2008. The results of the findings suggest the main difference in work ethic sentiments arose between the two most recent generational cohorts, Generation X and millennials, with relatively small variances between the two generations and their predecessor, the Baby Boomers.

A meta study conducted by researchers from The George Washington University and The U.S. Army Research Institute for the Behavioral and Social Sciences questions the validity of workplace differences across any generational cohort. According to the researchers, disagreement in which events to include when assigning generational cohorts, as well as varied opinions on which age ranges to include in each generational category are the main drivers behind their skepticism. The analysis of 20 research reports focusing on the three work-related factors of job satisfaction, organizational commitment and intent to turn over proved any variation was too small to discount the impact of employee tenure and aging of individuals. Newer research shows that millennials change jobs for the same reasons as other generations—namely, more money and a more innovative work environment. They look for versatility and flexibility in the workplace, and strive for a strong work–life balance in their jobs and have similar career aspirations to other generations, valuing financial security and a diverse workplace just as much as their older colleagues.

Data also suggests millennials are driving a shift towards the public service sector. In 2010, Myers and Sadaghiani published research in the Journal of Business and Psychology stating heightened participation in the Peace Corps and AmeriCorps as a result of millennials, with volunteering being at all-time highs. Volunteer activity between 2007 and 2008 show the millennial age group experienced almost three-times the increase of the overall population, which is consistent with a survey of 130 college upperclassmen depicting an emphasis on altruism in their upbringing. This has led, according to a Harvard University Institute of Politics, six out of ten millennials to consider a career in public service.

The 2014 Brookings publication shows a generational adherence to corporate social responsibility, with the National Society of High School Scholars (NSHSS) 2013 survey and Universum's 2011 survey, depicting a preference to work for companies engaged in the betterment of society. Millennials' shift in attitudes has led to data depicting 64% of millennials would take a 60% pay cut to pursue a career path aligned with their passions, and financial institutions have fallen out of favor with banks comprising 40% of the generation's least liked brands.

Use of digital technology

Marc Prensky coined the term "digital native" to describe "K through college" students in 2001, explaining they "represent the first generations to grow up with this new technology". In their 2007 book Connecting to the Net.Generation: What Higher Education Professionals Need to Know About Today's Students, authors Reynol Junco and Jeanna Mastrodicasa expanded on the work of William Strauss and Neil Howe to include research-based information about the personality profiles of millennials, especially as it relates to higher education. They conducted a large-sample (7,705) research study of college students. They found that Net Generation college students, born 1982 onwards, were frequently in touch with their parents and they used technology at higher rates than people from other generations. In their survey, they found that 97% of these students owned a computer, 94% owned a mobile phone, and 56% owned an MP3 player. They also found that students spoke with their parents an average of 1.5 times a day about a wide range of topics. Other findings in the Junco and Mastrodicasa survey revealed 76% of students used instant messaging, 92% of those reported multitasking while instant messaging, 40% of them used television to get most of their news, and 34% of students surveyed used the Internet as their primary news source.

One of the most popular forms of media use by millennials is social networking. Millennials use social networking sites, such as Facebook and Twitter, to create a different sense of belonging, make acquaintances, and to remain connected with friends. In 2010, research was published in the Elon Journal of Undergraduate Research which claimed that students who used social media and decided to quit showed the same withdrawal symptoms of a drug addict who quit their stimulant. In the 2014 PBS Frontline episode "Generation Like" there is discussion about millennials, their dependence on technology, and the ways the social media sphere is commoditized. Some millennials enjoy having hundreds of channels from cable TV. However, some other millennials do not even have a TV, so they watch media over the Internet using smartphones and tablets. Jesse Singal of New York magazine argues that this technology has created a rift within the generation; older millennials, defined here as those born 1988 and earlier, came of age prior to widespread usage and availability of smartphones, in contrast to younger millennials, those born in 1989 and later, who were exposed to this technology in their teen years.

A 2015 study found that the frequency of nearsightedness has doubled in the United Kingdom within the last 50 years. Ophthalmologist Steve Schallhorn, chairman of the Optical Express International Medical Advisory Board, noted that research have pointed to a link between the regular use of handheld electronic devices and eyestrain. The American Optometric Association sounded the alarm on a similar vein. According to a spokeswoman, digital eyestrain, or computer vision syndrome, is "rampant, especially as we move toward smaller devices and the prominence of devices increase in our everyday lives". Symptoms include dry and irritated eyes, fatigue, eye strain, blurry vision, difficulty focusing, headaches. However, the syndrome does not cause vision loss or any other permanent damage. In order to alleviate or prevent eyestrain, the Vision Council recommends that people limit screen time, take frequent breaks, adjust screen brightness, change the background from bright colors to gray, increase text sizes, and blink more often.

See also

 9X Generation
 Generation Snowflake, Little Emperor Syndrome, and Strawberry generation
 Sampo generation
 Thumb tribe

References

Further reading

External links
 The Downside of Diversity. Michael Jonas. The New York Times. 5 August 2007.
 Why 30 is not the new 20. Meg Jay. Ted Talk. 13 May 2013. (Video, 14:49)
 Gen-Z Matters More than millennials: Goldman Sachs' Christopher Wolf. 4 March 2016. (Video, 3:21)
 Is a University Degree a Waste of Money? CBC News: The National. 1 March 2017. (Video, 14:39)
 Why your smartphone is irresistible (and why it's worth trying to resist), PBS Newshour. 21 April 2017. Psychologist Adam Alter.

20th century
21st century
Cultural generations
1980s neologisms